= Ringworld series =

Science fiction novel series by Larry Niven

- Author: Larry Niven
- Illustrator: Dean Ellis
- Country: United States
- Language: English
- Genre: Science fiction
- Published: 1970 – 2012

The Ringworld series is a series of science fiction novels written by American author Larry Niven. It is part of his Known Space series of stories. Its backdrop is the Ringworld, a giant artifact 3 million times the surface area of Earth circling a star. The series is composed of four standalone science fiction novels, the original award-winning book and its three sequels:

- 1970: Ringworld
- 1979: The Ringworld Engineers
- 1996: The Ringworld Throne
- 2004: Ringworld's Children

The companion novels to the Ringworld series are set in the same "Known Space" universe and all written by Niven and Edward M. Lerner:

- 2007: Fleet of Worlds
- 2008: Juggler of Worlds
- 2009: Destroyer of Worlds
- 2010: Betrayer of Worlds
- 2012: Fate of Worlds
