= Ringworld (role-playing game) =

Science fiction tabletop role-playing game

Roleplaying Adventure Beneath the Great Arch
- Box cover
- Designers: Greg Stafford; John Hewitt; Sherman Kahn; Lynn Willis; Sandy Petersen; Rudy Kraft; Charlie Krank; Ed Gore; Jeff Okamoto
- Illustrators: Lisa Free; Ralph McQuarrie
- Publishers: Chaosium
- Publication: 1984; 42 years ago
- Genres: Science fiction
- Systems: Basic Role-Playing

The Ringworld science fiction role-playing game was published by Chaosium in 1984, using the Basic Role-Playing system for its rules and Larry Niven's Ringworld novels as a setting.

== Setting ==
The setting is a distant future based on extrapolation of as much hard science as Niven had available. Specifically, it's the 29th century. "Known Space" (also the commonly used title for Larry Niven's future history science fiction series) is about 80 light years in diameter with 10,000 stars, including Human Space (40 light years diameter, 524 stars in 357 systems, 30 billion humans, two-thirds on Earth), as well as neighbouring Alien civilisations. Important Alien civilisations include the Puppeteers, paranoid pacifist herbivore centaurs, and the Kzinti, carnivorous warlike felines, who fought multiple wars over hundreds of years against the Humans, being defeated each time. Human allies include intelligent dolphins and orcas.

"Known Space" only serves as a background for the game. The game is intended to be set on the Ringworld itself, an enormous single world discovered at the far reaches of Known Space, a ring around a sun at approximately the orbit of the Earth. It is 997,000 miles (1,605,000 km) wide, about 125 Earth-diameters. The total inner surface of the ring is equal to that of 3 million Earths. The ring is spun at a speed to provide 0.992 g of gravity on the innerside, while 20 giant shadow squares at about the orbit of Mercury occlude the Sun to provide night. It was constructed by the Pak Protectors, now mostly extinct, who had a common origin with humans. The Ringworld is home to some 30 trillion sentient inhabitants from up to 2000 hominid species. The world is described in a series of novels by Niven, Ringworld, The Ringworld Engineers, and, after the game's publication, The Ringworld Throne and Ringworld's Children.

Information from the RPG, along with notes composed by RPG author Hewitt with Niven, were later used to form the "Bible" given to authors writing in the Man-Kzin Wars series. Niven himself recommended that Hewitt write one of the stories for the original two MKW books, although this never came to pass.

== Gameplay ==
The players initially play explorers from Known Space, sent as scouts to the Ringworld. They can be anthropologists, artists, doctors, police, or even zealots, who will explore the mysteries of this huge artificial world and its inhabitants. Basic characters can be humans from a dozen planets of Human Space, Puppeteers, or Kzin. Later play can see characters from Ringworld species, such as the (so-called) Ghouls, Vampires, Giants, Sea People, and others.

This Ringworld focus has been a criticism of the game. The Ringworld role-playing game is not a 'full' science fiction RPG, like Traveller, including, for example, rules for starship construction, space combat, travel to different planets and systems, and so forth. Instead, the game and rules focused on parties of characters exploring the Ringworld itself, and, despite its vast size (with a surface area larger than that of all of Known Space's inhabited planets put together), many who bought the game felt limited by this one world setting.

== Game system ==
A character is initially defined by their species or world of origin, which affects characteristics (for example, by determining the gravity to which it is accustomed). Then the players roll randomly for a certain number of defects, character age, and characteristics. The system used is Chaosium's Basic Role-Playing, with eight basic characteristics: Strength, Constitution, Mass (equivalent to Size in other BRP games), Intelligence, Power, Dexterity, Appearance and Education determining secondary attributes such damage modifiers, hit points, and skill rolls.

At creation, each character gets to spend a number of points (based mainly on age, Education, and Intelligence) on skills determined by interests or career choice. Each of the three playable races has specific tables for the creation of characters. Character Skills are based on percentages. To succeed in a skill, the player must roll under the relevant skill with modifiers on percentile dice.

Another critique of the game system has been the large effect of character age on skills, usually considered the most important character attributes. In Niven's future world, the deterioration of age has been largely reversed, so humans live hundreds of years. Therefore, a 200-year-old character will have vastly more skill points than a 20-year-old, with little compensatory advantages for the younger one.

== Publications ==
Only two publications were published, the Ringworld role-playing game box set itself, and the Ringworld Companion, both in 1984 by Chaosium. The magazine Different Worlds, issue 37, featured a Ringworld adventure, "Louis Wu & His Motley Crew." The article "The Dolphins of Known Space: A new race for the Ringworld Game" appeared in Dragon Magazine issue 95.

=== Ringworld Box Set ===
The Ringworld role-playing game box set was titled "Larry Niven's Ringworld: Roleplaying Adventure Beneath the Great Arch", referring to the way the Ringworld looked from its interior surface. The authors are credited as Greg Stafford, John Hewitt, Sherman Kahn, Lynn Willis, Sandy Petersen, Rudy Kraft, Charlie Krank, Ed Gore, and Jeff Okamoto. It came in a box set with four books: the Explorer Book, Technology Book, Gamemasters Book, and Creatures Book, a sheet of cardboard miniatures, reference and character sheets, and a set of dice: 2d20 (actually dice with two sets of digits 0 to 9), 1d8, and 2d6.

==== Explorer Book ====
This book begins with a character sheet. It introduces role-playing games, then covers character creation, skill use, and combat. It presents a detailed history of humanity between the 20th and 29th centuries. It then describes eleven human worlds: Belt (the asteroid belt), Canyon, Down, Gummidgy, Home, Jinx, Margrave, Plateau, Silvereyes, "We Made It" and Wunderland. Finally, it gives rules for non-human, Kzin or Puppeteer, player characters, and a glossary.

==== Gamemaster Book ====
The Gamemaster Book begins with technical essays on the Ringworld, from physical construction, to life on the ring, with diagrams. There is a section on the "City Builders"—a Ringworld race that dominated the Ringworld, built floating cities, and sent spaceships to explore other worlds, until a mysterious technological virus destroyed their empire. Another section lists unanswered questions about the Ringworld. There are suggestions for creating scenarios and campaigns, and information on technology of various humanoid species of the Ringworld, and additional rules, including gravity, Credit Rating, and psionics. There is also an introductory scenario ("The Journey of the Catseye") intended to begin a Ringworld campaign. The characters are hired by Captain Gregor Lopez, famous explorer, for a journey to the Ringworld that does not go completely as planned.

==== Technology Book ====
The Technology Book gives rules and descriptions of the equipment employed by the explorers of the 29th century, categorized into generators, computers, medical equipment, tools, vehicles, weapons and defenses.

==== Creature Book ====
The Creature Book gives rules and descriptions for creatures, divided into Aliens, Humanoids, Animals and Plants. Many races get specialized hit location tables, characteristic maxima and minima, skills and traits.

=== Ringworld Companion ===
Ringworld Companion cover

The Ringworld Companion supplement was published not long after the box set. The authors are credited as Greg Stafford, John Hewitt, Sherman Kahn, Lynn Willis, Sandy Petersen, Rudy Kraft, and Charlie Krank.

The book starts with a diagram of the Ringworld and its star, EC-1752, new humanoids, aliens, plants and animals, technological objects, and original errata. There is some information on spaceships (Human and City Builder), hyperspace, a map of Human Space, and statistics for vehicles used on the Ringworld. Then there is a new race, the "Agamans", desert nomads, and a scenario involving them, "The Sand Eaters". Finally, there is a three part scenario named "The Kaladians", about the defense of travelling merchants. Both scenarios can be integrated into the campaign given in the basic set. None of these three additional races appear in any of the Ringworld novels.

== Reception ==
Phil Masters reviewed Ringworld for White Dwarf #59, giving it an overall rating of 6 out of 10, and stated that "This game takes a superb background idea, applies a good system of mechanics to it, and comes back with a disappointing result."

Steve Peterson reviewed Ringworld in Space Gamer No. 71. Peterson commented that "Niven fans should buy it for the essays and background materials. Role-players should be prepared to do some work on scenarios; but if you do, you'll have some terrific roleplaying in a beautifully detailed world. Science-fiction gamers who want to use it for source material probably won't get their money's worth."

In Issue 4 of the French games magazine Casus Belli, Jean Balcezak commented, "Without being extremely complex, this game is nevertheless aimed at experienced players eager to discover new settings." Balcezak was quite taken with the game, writing, "Ringworld is set to become a 'must' that every serious role player should have in their game library."

Jeff Seiken reviewed Ringworld for Different Worlds magazine and stated that "the rulebooks contain numerous essays devoted to specific facets of Ringworld to assist the gamemaster in constructing a suitable (and viable) campaign. These essays are both well-written and invaluable. In fact, as befitting a product which owes its origins to a literary source, Ringworld stands out as an extremely literate role-playing game. Digesting the extensive amounts of factual information presented in the essays may demand a significant commitment of time and energy on the part of the gamemaster, but then the rewards of role-playing in the world of Ringworld will far outstrip the effort."

Steve Nutt reviewed Ringworld for Imagine magazine, and stated that "Altogether, Ringworld's advantages and disadvantages stem from its campaign setting. The actual mechanics of the game are top quality, yet background and atmosphere are what make or break a campaign, and in Ringworld this aspect could be somewhat daunting to the uninitiated."

In his 1990 book The Complete Guide to Role-Playing Games, game critic Rick Swan called this "a terrific setting, but only a so-so game." Swan felt "Though the game systems are adequate, they're nothing out of the ordinary." Swan also pointed out that although there was a lot of background material, "there's not much help of any kind for the Ringworld referee; not only does he have his hands full managing a planet roughly the size of 3 million Earths, the game presumes he has a basic understanding of physics, embryology, and other sciences. And unless he is familiar with the original novel, it's unlikely that the referee will have a clue as to how to stage an adventure." Swan concluded by giving the game a rating of 2.5 out of 4.

James Davis Nicoll in 2020 for Black Gate said "Production values were very high, as was the price [...] Yes, that's a Ralph McQuarrie cover. LNRW: RABtGA was also doomed, because scarcely had the game come out before Niven made a lucrative media deal and yanked the rights back from Chaosium. LNRW: RABtGA is very much out of print."

== Reviews ==
- Micro Adventurer
- Analog Science Fiction and Fact
