= N-Space (short story collection) =

1990 collection of short stories by Larry Niven

- First edition
- Author: Larry Niven
- Cover artist: Dave Archer
- Language: English
- Genre: Science fiction
- Publisher: Tor Books
- Publication date: 1990
- Publication place: United States
- Media type: Print (hardback & paperback)
- Pages: 527 (hardcover edition)
- ISBN: 0-8125-1001-1
- OCLC: 24426024

N-Space is a collection of short stories by American science fiction author Larry Niven released in 1990. Some of the stories are set in Niven's Known Space universe. Also included are various essays, articles and anecdotes by Niven and others, excerpts from some of his novels, and an introduction by Tom Clancy. Its sequel is Playgrounds of the Mind.

== Contents ==
- "Introduction: The Maker of Worlds" by Tom Clancy
- On Niven (by David Brin, Gregory Benford, Wendy All, John Hertz, Steven Barnes, and Frederik Pohl)
- Dramatis Personae
- Foreword: Playgrounds for the Mind
- from World of Ptavvs
- "Bordered in Black"
- "Convergent Series"
- "All the Myriad Ways"
- from "A Gift From Earth"
- "For a Foggy Night"
- "The Meddler"
- "Passerby"
- "Down in Flames"
- from Ringworld
- "The Fourth Profession"
- "Shall We Indulge in Rishathra?" (with cartoons by William Rotsler)
- "Man of Steel, Woman of Kleenex"
- "Inconstant Moon"
- "What Can You Say about Chocolate Covered Manhole Covers?"
- "Cloak of Anarchy"
- from Protector
- "The Hole Man"
- "Night on Mispec Moor"
- "Flare Time"
- "The Locusts" (with Steven Barnes)
- from The Mote in God's Eye (with Jerry Pournelle)
- Building "The Mote in God's Eye" (with Jerry Pournelle)
- "Brenda"
- "The Return of William Proxmire"
- "The Tale of the Jinni and the Sisters"
- "Madness Has its Place"
- "Niven's Laws"
- "The Kiteman"
- "The Alien in Our Minds"
- "Space"
- Bibliography of Larry Niven
