= Pak Protector =

Fictional species in works of Larry Niven

Phssthpok, a Pak Protector eating Tree-of-Life root in the Library on the Pak homeworld

Pak Breeders and Pak Protectors are two developmental stages of fictional life in Larry Niven's Known Space universe. The Pak first appeared in "The Adults", which appeared in Galaxy in 1967; this story was expanded into the novel Protector by Larry Niven (1973). The Pak also appear in several of Niven's later novels, notably those set in the Ringworld.

Destroyer of Worlds depicts a confrontation between the Pak and the Puppeteers.

== Narrative purpose ==
Niven has written that he invented the Protectors as a thought experiment to explain the common effects of aging on humans and to create a fictional evolutionary explanation for humans' long lives after females have passed reproductive age. Accordingly, most of the positive attributes of Protectors are based on negative human aging effects: swollen joints, decreased muscle-fat ratio, weakening heart, invariant diet, decreasing height, facial atrophy, leathery skin, hair loss, lack of sex drive, and tooth loss are all turned to advantage during the shift from Breeder to Protector.

== The Pak species ==
In Protector, the audience learns that humans are descended from the Pak. Pak Children and Breeders appear in Earth's fossil record as Homo habilis; the few Pak Protectors to make it to Earth apparently are not found in the fossil record.

The Pak species goes through three stages of development:

- Pak child is analogous to a human child: sexually immature and dependent upon adults for survival.
- Pak breeder is analogous to a young-ish human adult: sexually mature, self-sufficient (in later writings) and providing immediate care for the children. To the Pak, the Breeder stage, though capable of space travel, is not deemed fully sapient; Breeders, to a large extent, rely on Protectors for long-term survival. Earlier Niven stories describe the breeder as "just intelligent enough to swing a club or throw a stone".
- Pak protector is not analogous to any human form. It is described as a 'fighting machine', with armor-like skin, super-human strength and super-human intelligence. Niven's stories that focus on the Pak mostly concentrate on the unique Protector stage.

Niven explained the evolution of the Pak as resulting from high radiation levels on their home world near the core of the galaxy. The high radiation near the star-dense core caused severe mutations that can destabilize the evolutionary process. As a result, the Pak evolved a mechanism to eliminate dangerous mutations from the population. That mechanism is the Protector stage.

Protectors are highly sensitive to the smell of their close relatives and "weed out" those that smell wrong, which may indicate a potentially dangerous mutation. This weeding also suppressed positive mutations, essentially halting Pak evolution. Protectors are fully sentient, and are far more intelligent than ordinary humans. This "superior" intelligence, however, serves only a Pak Protector's instincts to protect its bloodline at any costs. The Pak have no drive toward the collection of abstract knowledge, have no concept of art, and do not even possess enough of an artistic impulse to understand the purpose of making sketches and paintings for reasons not directly useful.

The change from Breeder to Protector is the result of a peramorphic transformation brought about by the plant known as Tree-of-Life. As humans (and all primates) are descended from the Pak, Tree-of-Life can create a Protector-stage human.

== Tree-of-Life ==
Tree-of-Life is the mechanism by which a Breeder becomes a Protector. The term originally is used to refer to a specific plant which, when consumed, triggers the transformation. The term "Tree-of-Life virus" is used to describe the symbiotic virus which actually governs the transition.

Niven took the name Tree-of-Life from the Book of Genesis; specifically to the fruit of the "Tree of Life" that could make Adam and Eve immortal (Genesis 3:22–24), which is quoted as the foreword to the novel Protector, and also mentioned by Brennan within the novel.

Tree-of-Life is a bush native to the Pak homeworld. When a Breeder reaches the proper age (early 40s for humans), the smell of the root becomes irresistible; the Breeder gorges on the Tree-of-Life root, infecting itself with the Tree-of-Life virus and transforming into a Protector. The age window for the metamorphosis is relatively narrow (between 42 and 50 Earth years). Tree-of-Life is common on the Pak world, so there is almost no risk of a Breeder living past this window without being exposed to the roots.

The transition from Breeder to Protector involves reconfiguration of the anatomy. Skin thickens, becoming similar to leather armor, strong enough to turn a copper knife. Joints swell until the creature becomes "a parody of the human form done in cantaloupes and coconuts". This increases leverage available to muscles by increasing the force of the moment arm, the result being that a protector can lift ten times its own weight. Genitalia and gonads vanish, and a second two-chambered heart forms in the groin at the fusion of the femoral veins. The arms lengthen. Fingernails turn into retractable claws. Teeth fall out and the lips and gums fuse, the mouth forming a horny beak (flat in protectors transformed from humans, non-flat in protectors transformed from Pak). All the breeder's hair falls out and the head acquires a bony ridge to protect the newly expanded cranium. The expanded skull allows the brain to grow to an enormous size; the resulting mind, even starting from something as "unintelligent" as a chimpanzee, becomes far more intelligent than a typical human. Pak Protectors also acquire an extended lifespan, and can live tens of thousands of Earth years (a common element in Niven's stories).

Once the transformation is complete, a Pak Protector must periodically consume more Tree-of-Life root to maintain the virus in its body. Without the virus, a Protector will weaken and die as its DNA is degraded; the virus supplies replacement DNA.

The Tree-of-Life crop on Earth failed due to there being insufficient thallium oxide (which particular oxide is never explained) in the Earth's soil; the plants grew but did not support the virus. As a result, the Protectors that led the colony to Earth died of starvation when their store of roots ran out.

== Protector behavior ==
Pak Protectors have an innate need to protect close relatives. When a Pak Protector has no bloodline to protect, it usually stops eating and starves, though some childless Protectors can adopt the entire Pak race as their family.

Niven states that Protectors on the crowded Pak homeworld would constantly war against each other to gain advantage for their family and that alliances would last only until one ally sees advantage in betrayal. Human Protectors, and those on the Ringworld, seem to be less warlike and better able to work for the betterment of the entire species (or all of the Ringworld hominids) rather than just their bloodline, though this may simply be a function of how few Protectors with families encounter each other.

Protectors typically die from starvation (from lack of will to live, e.g. if the Protector's bloodline has died out, in which case they simply stop eating until death takes them) or violence. Although Protectors have a vastly extended lifetime, it is not infinite; during the original half-million year journey to Earth some Protector colonists did die from old age.

Because of their enormous intelligence and instinctive need to protect their family (or their species, etc.), Protectors are efficient, ruthless and quite amoral. Xenophobia is a commonly displayed trait: other races are considered either unnecessary or potentially dangerous. It is observed several times that this intelligence combined with instinct also compels action so completely that Protectors often have little "free will". Niven uses this trait as a plot device several times as characters set up circumstances where Protector characters will react in a specific manner. In Protector, Jack Brennan (a human turned into a Protector) commits genocide by exterminating the Martian race ("Aliens were dangerous, or might be, and Pak were not interested in anything but Pak") and also releases a genetically modified Tree-of-Life virus on the colony world Home, turning everyone middle aged into a Protector (and killing all other humans on the planet) in order to create an army of childless Protectors with which to fight the invading Pak fleet. It is indicated throughout Niven's works that humans (Homo sapiens) that have turned into protectors are far more intelligent than their Pak (Homo habilis) counterparts (in much the way that humans are more intelligent than the primates they evolved from) and that the Pak may, in fact, be the final evolutionary stage for the human race as a whole.

Niven explains much of Protector behavior in his Future History, by revealing in Ringworld's Children that the ARM may be run by at least one Protector and that Boosterspice (which dramatically prolongs human lifespan) is derived from Tree-of-Life.

== The Pak and humanity ==
In Protector, Niven explains that humans (and all of Earth's primates) are descended from a colony of Pak breeders that were stranded on Earth 2.5 million years ago. The protectors that built the colony's ship died when their Tree-of-Life crops failed. The original Pak Breeder population (known to us as Homo habilis) bred and mutated wildly, evolving into modern humans as well as all other Earth primates. All Terran primates would transform into the Protector stage if exposed to Tree-of-Life root (or, more accurately, the symbiotic virus it contains).

In The Ringworld Engineers, the characters find evidence that the Ringworld was built by Pak Protectors (confirmed by the statements of a character in Ringworld's Children who claims to be one of the original builders) and populated by Pak breeders. The Pak Protectors dwindled in numbers until they were no longer able to maintain the genetic purity of the breeder forms and the breeders eventually evolved into all the other hominids of the Ringworld that one sees in Larry Niven's novels.

In Destroyer of Worlds (co-written by Niven and Edward M. Lerner), a human world (and the Pierson's Puppeteers of the Fleet of Worlds) confronts a Pak Protector war fleet. The trailing edge of that Pak fleet, carrying the primary Pak Library, also figures prominently in Betrayer of Worlds, by the same authors.

== See also ==
- Protector
- Ringworld
- The Ringworld Engineers
- The Ringworld Throne
- Ringworld's Children
- Man-Kzin Wars XI
- Destroyer of Worlds
- Betrayer of Worlds
