= Louis Wu =

Fictional character created by Larry Niven

Louis Gridley Wu
- Ringworld character
- First appearance: 1968, "There Is a Tide"
- Created by: Larry Niven

In-universe information
- Gender: Male
- Occupation: Adventurer

Louis Gridley Wu, a fictional character, is the protagonist in Larry Niven's Ringworld book series.

Louis Wu was born in 2650 to Carlos Wu and Sharrol Janss. When he appears in Ringworld, Louis is 6′2″ (188 cm) tall. Without "Flatlander" bodypaint, his brown eyes show no discernible slant and his yellow-brown skinned features are a blended fusion of Earth's many races. Born a "Flatlander", Louis is best known among his friends for inventing the "Sabbatical"—going off alone in a spaceship outside the boundaries of known space until one can tolerate human company again. Louis was the first human being to make contact with the Trinoc species.

He is also the only hominid ever to become a Protector and return to normal (Breeder) state afterward.

== Birth and childhood ==
Louis Wu is the second of two children born to Carlos Wu and Sharrol Janss. Sharrol was married to Beowulf (or "Bey") Shaeffer at the time but the Fertility Board of the United Nations of Earth had absolute control over reproductive rights on that planet (its population was about 18 billion at the time). The Board denied a parenthood license to Shaeffer based on his albinism, considering it an undesirable genetic trait. Sharrol was unable to leave Earth because of her Flatland Phobia, a fear of being off-planet. They asked Carlos Wu, a friend of Sharrol's who has an unlimited parenthood license, to help them. Sharrol and Wu were married on a two-year contract arrangement; Tanya Wu was born in 2649 and Louis a year later, 2650. Shaeffer returned to Earth in 2650 and both children were raised by Sharrol and Beowulf. Carlos remained a family friend to both Beowulf and Sharrol. Several years later, amidst unusual and perilous circumstances, Louis, his sister, mother, and adoptive father (Beowulf) along with Carlos and Carlos' girlfriend, Feather Filip, secretly and illegally emigrated from Earth to Fafnir.

Upon reaching Fafnir, Feather shot Shaeffer in the chest with an ARM punchgun, but Carlos managed to escape with Tanya and Louis. Sharrol killed Feather by cutting her throat, then decapitating her. Sharrol then placed Bey's head (after removing it from his body) in Carlos's nanotechnology-based autodoc where it reconstructed his body, sizing it to the Intensive Care Cavity of the autodoc, which was tailored to Carlos's body proportions. Eventually, Beowulf recovered, was reunited with Sharrol, and had two more children with her, Jeena and an unnamed second child; therefore, Louis has one sister and two half-siblings, who grew up on the Home colony world. Eventually, in his adulthood, Louis moved to Earth, and in the years between his two trips to the Ringworld he relocated to Canyon. At the end of Ringworld's Children he is in a spaceship, heading back to Home.

While Louis Wu was raised by Beowulf Shaeffer, in the first Ringworld novel Louis seems not to know who Shaeffer is, nor does he make any reference to his relation to Carlos upon encountering the same autodoc in the later Ringworld novels. As the Known Space universe continued to grow in complexity with each newly published story, Louis' own backstory was increasingly retconned to fit in with this continuity. This is also probably why Louis never reflected on the obviously traumatic events in his childhood that took place on Fafnir. This might also be explained as Louis simply being tight-lipped about certain aspects of his personal history, a trait he shared with both his biological father Carlos and his adoptive father Beowulf.

== Pre-Ringworld ==
According to narration in Ringworld, Wu ran for political office in the United Nations in his middle 70s. He lost the election but in the process of running learned an oratorical technique he would later use to attempt to convince Teela Brown not to come on what would later turn out to be the first Ringworld expedition.

In an adventure some 70 years before the events of Ringworld (around when Wu was 130, related in Betrayer of Worlds), that he does not recall in his later life (e.g., in Ringworld), Louis is found by a Pierson's Puppeteer named Nessus while working in a hospital in a rebel camp on Wunderland and severely addicted to pain killers. Nessus is attempting to find members of Louis' family, but Louis reports them dead. Desperate and hoping Louis has similar talents, Nessus recruits Louis with the understanding that his memory would be altered before his return to Known Space, he would be saved from the Civil War on Wunderland, well compensated and cured of his addiction.

Louis' task is initially to prevent a war between the Puppeteers and Gw'oth. He eventually ends up preventing a genocide, observing the removal of the legitimate Puppeteer government, its ironic replacement with a puppet regime controlled by the Gw'oth, and finding himself with a very large Puppeteer bounty on his own head. Taking it for granted that he would eventually be discovered in Puppeteer regions of space, he agrees to let Nessus alter his memory and return him to Known Space.

He awakens on a very expensive FTL singleship near Known Space, physically younger than he recalled, unaddicted (the ship refuses to provide him with alcohol or pills), and without recollection of how he came to be in this situation while several months away from Sol and Wunderland. He attributes the memory loss to pill usage and resolves to sell his ship as soon as he arrives back in the Sol system.

In terms of in-universe chronology (falling in-between Betrayer of Worlds and Ringworld), Wu later appears in the short story "There Is a Tide", where he becomes the first human to make contact with the Trinoc species. In terms of publication chronology, "There Is a Tide" is the story where Wu first appears.

== Appearance in Ringworld ==
At the beginning of Ringworld, Louis celebrated his 200th birthday by working his way from party to party around the world using transfer booths to stay ahead of the dateline.

After one of his booth transfers gets diverted to a hotel room, he accepts an offer to go on an expedition with three other members – two aliens (a Pierson's Puppeteer named Nessus, and a catlike Kzin called Speaker-to-Animals) and Teela Brown, a human female supposedly bred for luck. Unfortunately, the group crash-lands on the Ringworld, a huge structure with 3,000,000 times the surface area of Earth.

When Louis comes up with an ingenious way to get them home, he is rewarded by the Puppeteers with the "Quantum II Hyperdrive", capable of moving a spaceship one light-year in 1.25 minutes.

Louis then returns to the Ringworld looking for matter conversion technology for another Pierson's Puppeteer, a deposed leader (the "Hindmost"). While there, he discovers that the Ringworld is unstable. He decides to save the Ringworld with Speaker-To-Animals (renamed Chmeee) and the Hindmost (after Louis destroys the hyperdrive motor, trapping them there again).

Louis appears again for the last two Ringworld books, where he tries to get the Pak Protectors in line in The Ringworld Throne and finally escapes in Ringworld's Children. Events immediately following his escape are chronicled in Fate of Worlds (subtitled Return from the Ringworld).

== List of Louis Wu novels and short stories ==
- There Is a Tide
- Betrayer of Worlds
- Ringworld
- The Ringworld Engineers
- The Ringworld Throne
- Ringworld's Children
- Fate of Worlds
