= Playgrounds of the Mind =

1991 collection of short stories by Larry Niven

- First edition cover Cover art by Dave Archer
- Author: Larry Niven
- Publisher: Tor Books
- Publication date: October 1, 1991
- Pages: 528
- ISBN: 0-312-85219-3

Playgrounds of the Mind is a 1991 short story collection by American writer Larry Niven. It is the sequel to N-Space.

Many of the stories are set in Niven's Known Space universe. There are also excerpts from his The Magic Goes Away novel series, as well as several stories from his The Draco Tavern setting (an alien bar) and other sources.

== Contents ==
- "Thraxisp: A Memoir"
- "A Teardrop Falls" (Note: "A Teardrop Falls" is set in Fred Saberhagen's Berserker universe.)
- From Inferno (with Jerry Pournelle)
- From A World Out of Time
- "Rammer"
- From "The Ethics of Madness"
- "Becalmed in Hell"
- "Wait It Out"
- "A Relic of the Empire"
- From Lucifer's Hammer (with Jerry Pournelle)
- "The Soft Weapon" (Note: "The Soft Weapon" was adapted into an episode of Star Trek: The Animated Series called "The Slaver Weapon".)
- "The Borderland of Sol"
- From The Ringworld Engineers
- "What Good Is a Glass Dagger?"
- From The Magic Goes Away
- "The Defenseless Dead"
- From The Patchwork Girl
- "Leviathan!"
- From Oath of Fealty (with Jerry Pournelle)
- Unfinished Story
- "Cautionary Tales"
- "The Dreadful White Page"
- From Dream Park (with Steven Barnes)
- "Retrospective"
- "The Green Marauder"
- "Assimilating Our Culture, That's What They're Doing!"
- "War Movie"
- "Limits"
- "The Lost Ideas"
- "Bigger Than Worlds"
- "Ghetto? But I Thought..."
- "Adrienne and Irish Coffee"
- "One Night at the Draco Tavern"
- "TrantorCon Report" (Note: "TrantorCon Report" is a humorous article about planning a science fiction convention 20,000 years from now on the planet Trantor (from Isaac Asimov's Empire series), with guests from every fictional universe. Tickets must be reserved in advance.)
- "Why Men Fight Wars, and What You Can Do About It!"
- Comics
- From Green Lantern Bible
- Criticism
- From The Legacy of Heorot (with Jerry Pournelle and Steven Barnes)
- "The Portrait of Daryanree the King" (Note: "The Portrait of Daryanree the King" is loosely based on The Picture of Dorian Gray by Oscar Wilde.)
- "The Wishing Game"
- "The Lion In His Attic"
- From Footfall (with Jerry Pournelle)
- Works in Progress
- From The Moat Around Murcheson's Eye
- From Fallen Angels
- "Wanted Fan"
- [from] The California Voodoo Game
- "Letter"
