= N-space =

N-space may refer to:

- n-Space, video game development company
- n-dimensional space, in physics and mathematics, a space of dimension n
- En space, in typography, a space that is one en wide ( )
- N-Space (short story collection), a book from 1990
