= The Slaver Weapon =

- Star Trek: The Animated Series episode
- Chuft-Captain, a Kzin
- Episode no.: Season 1 Episode 14
- Directed by: Hal Sutherland
- Written by: Larry Niven
- Story by: Larry Niven
- Production code: 22011
- Original air date: December 8, 1973

Episode chronology
← Previous "The Ambergris Element"	Next → "The Eye of the Beholder"

"The Slaver Weapon" is the fourteenth episode of the first season of the American animated science fiction television series Star Trek: The Animated Series. It first aired on NBC on December 8, 1973, and was written by Larry Niven. It was based on his original short story "The Soft Weapon". This episode was expanded to become the first half of a full-length novel by science-fiction author Alan Dean Foster as Star Trek Log Ten.

Set in the 23rd century, the series follows the adventures of Captain James T. Kirk (voiced by William Shatner) and the crew of the Starfleet starship Enterprise. In this episode, while traveling by shuttlecraft, several Enterprise crew members are captured and have to use their individual strengths to prevent a powerful alien weapon from falling into the wrong hands.

== Plot ==
On stardate 4187.3, the Enterprise shuttlecraft Copernicus, carrying Science Officer Spock (voiced by Leonard Nimoy), Communications Officer Lt. Uhura (voiced by Nichelle Nichols), and Helmsman Lt. Hikaru Sulu (voiced by George Takei) is en route to Starbase 25 to deliver a stasis box, a rare artifact of the Slaver culture. The now-extinct Slavers used these objects to carry weapons, valuables, scientific instruments and data. The boxes can detect each other and evidence shows that another device is located near Beta Lyrae.

Following the signal, the shuttle lands on an ice planet where the crew is captured by the hostile, catlike Kzinti. The Kzinti had an empty stasis box of their own, and were using it to lure in passing starships. They are trying to steal the boxes in the hopes of finding a super weapon that will return their empire to its former greatness. The Kzinti open the box that the Enterprise had been transporting, finding inside some fresh meat, a picture of a Slaver, and a powerful (but unfamiliar) alien device, which the Kzinti immediately suspect is a weapon.

The weapon passes hands several times between the Federation and Kzinti crews, during which time Sulu discovers a total-conversion beam setting. The Kzinti recapture all three Federation personnel and the weapon. As the Kzinti explore the device's many settings, they discover a war computer that starts talking to them. After the Kzinti fail to provide several code words and ask about the total-conversion beam setting, the weapon concludes that they are enemies and directs them to what it claims is the setting that they want but which is actually a self-destruct setting. When the Kzinti activate that setting it turns out to be a disruptor field that destroys the weapon and kills the Kzinti.

== Production ==
Producer D. C. Fontana approached Larry Niven in 1973 to see if he would write an episode for The Animated Series, suggesting that he might adapt one of his existing stories. At the time Niven was a major up-and-coming force in the science fiction world; in 1971 his novel Ringworld was awarded the Hugo Award for Best Novel, the Nebula Award for Best Novel and the Locus Award for Best Novel. Niven's first attempt to write a teleplay introduced his Known Space setting into the Star Trek universe. The story involved a group of Outsiders who were using a quantum black hole to disable passing ships drives' in order to pirate them. Fontana advised him that the original version wouldn't work as an episode, and his second attempt proved to be "too bloody."

While Niven visited Gene Roddenberry's house one afternoon, Roddenberry suggested that he use his short story "The Soft Weapon" as the basis for an episode. This story opens with a small spacecraft making a quick side-trip to view Beta Lyrae. On board are the human couple who crew the spacecraft, and their passenger, a Pierson's Puppeteer named Nessus. Nessus has a stasis box in his possession, and a routine scan reveals that another stasis box is located somewhere in the Beta Lyrae system, much to their surprise. When they attempt to retrieve the second box, they are captured by a group of Kzinti pirates. The Kzinti are in possession of an empty stasis box, and are using it to lure in passing starships. The three outwit the Kzinti and escape.

For the adaptation into the Star Trek universe, Niven changed the identity of the characters in the original to their analogs in Star Trek. Nessus, a highly intelligent normally pacifist herbivore, fitted neatly onto the character of Spock. The original male and female starship crew were replaced by Sulu and Uhura, while the small spacecraft became the newly introduced long-range shuttlecraft. The characters from the Kzinti ship remained unchanged.

There were minor changes to simplify the storytelling, but only one major change. In "The Soft Weapon" the artifacts were built by the Tnuctipun, a technologically advanced species that had been enslaved by the Thrintun, the eponymous "Slavers". They had built many weapons in secret like this one as part of a long-planned revolt. This backstory is outside the scope of "The Slaver Weapon", and in this version the box and weapon are presumed to be of Slaver origin.

That the Kzinti's clothing and ships were depicted in shades of pink was long rumored to be due to director Hal Sutherland suffering colorblindness, but this was contradicted by Bob Kline, Filmation designer and layout artist, who stated in a podcast interview that the color choices were the work of color stylist Irv Kaplan. An apology was offered to Larry Niven for this oversight.

This is the first Star Trek story broadcast (in either its live-action or animated incarnations) in which James T. Kirk (William Shatner) does not appear, although his voice is heard in the standard opening credits. (Kirk also did not appear in the live-action pilot "The Cage", but that was not broadcast in its original form until 1988.) As well, in another first, the starship Enterprise does not appear, except in the standard opening credits.

== Reception ==
The episode was reviewed by Mark Altman and Edward Gross in their book, Trek Navigator, where they called it "by far one of the best and most literate of the animated episodes." They described the Kzinti as a "fascinating" new enemy, and praised the introduction of the Slaver boxes. The voice work was said to be "surprisingly good", but the animation was criticised with the pink ship and uniforms of the aliens "somewhat negates their menace."

== Legacy ==
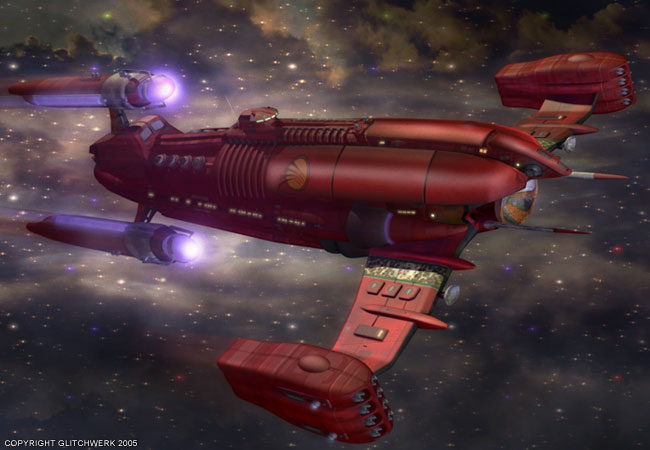
The Kzinti Dark Stalker vessel as designed by Josh Finney

Following production of "The Slaver Weapon", Niven returned to his Known Space concept and began to expand it. "The Borderland of Sol" was developed from his original pitch for The Animated Series and was first published in Analog magazine in January 1975, and republished in the collection Tales of Known Space in the same year. It was awarded the Hugo Award for Best Novelette in 1976, and republished as part of the novel Crashlander in 1994. Niven later wrote a storyline in the syndicated Star Trek newspaper comic strip entitled "The Wristwatch Plantation", which re-introduced the Kzinti to that universe once more.

While production was under way on the fourth season of Star Trek: Enterprise, Niven commented that he was aware of efforts to re-introduce the Kzinti into the Star Trek franchise, and had "always hoped [they] could make it work." At the same time, the Kzinti were featured in the Star Trek Communicator magazine as one of the alien races representing the seven deadly sins, with the Kzinti being specifically related to lust. This was because of the Kzinti's need to feed on the flesh of others being "gastronomic instead of carnal" which meant that they are seen as "sensual, without being overtly sexual." A CGI animated film called Star Trek: Lions of the Night was in development by writer Jimmy Diggs at the time, which would have had Captain Hikaru Sulu attempting to prevent a Kzinti invasion of the Federation using the USS Enterprise (NCC-1701-B). Manny Coto, the show runner for Enterprise, had been pursuing the idea of including the Kzinti into the series for the fifth season called "Kilkenny Cats" based on the Diggs idea. However, the series was cancelled at the end of the fourth and the episode was never made. Josh Finney had been commissioned by Diggs to design a Kzinti vessel for the possible inclusion in the Enterprise episode.

In the Star Trek: Picard episode "Nepenthe", William Riker references "The Slaver Weapon" by saying, "We've had a little trouble around here lately with the Kzinti."

A Kzin Starfleet officer is a minor recurring character in Star Trek: Lower Decks with the name Taylor.
