= World of Ptavvs =

1966 novel by Larry Niven

- Cover of first edition (paperback).
- Author: Larry Niven
- Cover artist: Norman Adams
- Language: English
- Series: Known Space Universe
- Genre: Science fiction
- Published: 1966 (Ballantine Books)
- Publication place: United States
- Media type: Print (hardback & paperback)
- Pages: 188 pp

World of Ptavvs is the first novel by American science fiction writer Larry Niven, published in 1966 and set in his Known Space universe. A “much shorter version” was originally published as a novella in Worlds of Tomorrow in March 1965. The plot is largely unchanged, but most of the Belter narration is new, as is the date of the action, 2106. The original title for the novella submitted to editor Frederik Pohl was “Relic of Empire”; Judy-Lynn Benjamin (later Del Rey) renamed it “World of Ptavvs.” Pohl sent it to Ballantine Books, suggesting it could become a novel, where it was purchased by Betty Ballantine. Niven later recycled his original title for the novelette “A Relic of the Empire” published in If, December 1966.

== Plot summary ==
A reflective statue is found at the bottom of one of Earth's oceans, having lain there for 1.5 billion years. Since humans have recently developed a time-slowing field and found that one such field cannot function within another, it is suspected that the "Sea Statue" is actually a space traveler within one of these time fields. Larry Greenberg, a telepath, agrees to participate in an experiment: a time-slowing field is generated around both Greenberg and the statue, shutting off the stasis field and revealing Kzanol. Kzanol is a living Thrint, a member of a not particularly bright telepathic race that once ruled the galaxy through their enslavement of more intelligent species with their Power (mind control).

Eons ago, Kzanol's spaceship had suffered a catastrophic failure; its reactive drive system failed and the navigation computer automatically jettisoned it. Faced with insufficient power to use hyperspace, Kzanol aimed his ship at the nearest uninhabited Thrint planet used to grow yeast for food (Earth), and turned his spacesuit's emergency stasis field on to survive the long journey and impact. He also arranged for his ship to change course for the system's eighth planet (Neptune) after he was in stasis, with his amplifier helmet and other valuables stashed inside his spare suit (in order to hide these valuables from any rescuers).

Although he assumed that the resident Thrint overseer would be able to rescue him after seeing the plume of gas created by his impact, his timing could not have been worse; while he was in stasis, the races enslaved by the Thrint revolted. Facing extinction, the Thrint decided to take their enemies with them by constructing a telepathic amplifier powerful enough to command all sentient species in the galaxy to commit suicide along with the Thrint themselves, Only the artificially created Bandersnatchi, who had been secretly designed by their creators, the Tnuctipun, to be resistant to the Power, survived this mass-extinction event. After hundreds of millions of years, the yeast food mutated and evolved into complex life on Earth and eventually into humans.

The telepathic encounter with the Thrint leaves the confused Greenberg with two sets of memories, his own and Kzanol's. He instinctively assumes he was Kzanol, the much more powerful telepath. Both Greenberg and the real Kzanol steal spaceships and race to reclaim the thought-amplifying machine on Neptune, which is powerful enough to enable a single Thrint to control every thinking being in the Solar System. The chase leads to Pluto, which had been a moon of Neptune before it was knocked into its own orbit by the impact of Kzanol's ship. Eventually, Greenberg's personality reasserts itself and, armed with the knowledge of how to resist the Power (from Kzanol's own memories), Greenberg traps Kzanol again in a stasis field.

A major element of the story is the tension between Earth and the "Belters", which threatens to burst into a highly destructive war over control of the telepathic amplifier. The mutually accepted compromise is to drop the spacesuit containing the dangerous device, still in a stasis field, onto Jupiter, where no one can recover it.

== Reception ==
Algis Budrys described World of Ptavvs as "snappy, ingenious, and upbeat", praising Niven for "treat[ing] telepathy as the phenomenon it should logically be". Alan Brink noted that "Niven has made a very effective use of a teaser. A person who had not read the book has no way of knowing who or what 'Ptavvs' are; then you read it and find that we are ourselves Ptavvs and that Earth is the World of Ptavvs—as seen through alien eyes. The success of this book testifies to the effectiveness of Niven's curiosity-arousing device". (A Ptavv is a Thrint who lacks telepathic powers. Thrintun considered it a matter of great shame to have a Ptavv in their family and usually tattooed them pink to sell them as slaves.)

Charles Stross was inspired by the Thrintun/Tnuctipun relationship from World of Ptavvs when developing the relationship between the githyanki and illithids for Advanced Dungeons & Dragons. He also believed the illithids to have been originally inspired by the Thrintun.

According to Niven's recollection, Alexei Panshin wrote a "savage" review of Ptavvs for a fanzine and later cited it as a textbook example of how not to write a novel. Panshin, however, denied that he cited Ptavvs outside of the initial review.

== Connections to other Niven works ==
The Thrintun are mentioned in the story "The Handicapped".

In the novel Protector, protagonist Elroy Truesdale observes the Sea Statue whilst visiting the Smithsonian Institution: "It looked the product of some advanced civilization... and it was; it was a pressure suit with emergency stasis field facilities, and the thing inside was very dangerous. Once it had gotten loose."

== Similar themes by other writers ==
The theme of a human telepath "absorbing" the mind of an alien and thereby gaining various abilities and pieces of information was also at the center of Clifford Simak's Time Is the Simplest Thing.

The theme of a telepathic being able to enslave and control humans, and who comes back to malevolent active life in present-day Earth after an enormous time spent in hibernation or stasis, was used by John Brunner in The Atlantic Abomination.
