= Ringworld Companion =

Ringworld Companion cover

Ringworld Companion is a 1984 role-playing game supplement published by Chaosium for Ringworld.

== Contents ==
Ringworld Companion is a supplement in which descriptions are included for 11 new hominid races, six new aliens, 21 new animals, alien plants, Human Space and Ringworld technology, and additionally an errata sheet. The supplement also features two adventure scenarios.

== Publication history ==
Ringworld Companion was written by John Hewitt, Lynn Willis, Greg Stafford, Sherman Kahn, Sandy Petersen, and Charlie Krank, and was published by Chaosium in 1984 as an 80-page book.

== Reviews ==
- The Last Province (Issue 4 - June / July 1993)
