= The Soft Weapon =

Short story by Larry Niven

First publication Cover art by Paul E. Wenzel

"The Soft Weapon" is a science fiction short story by the American writer Larry Niven, set in his Known Space universe. It was first published in the February 1967 issue of If.

The story introduces the character of Nessus, a Puppeteer who later became one of the main characters of the novel Ringworld. The story is retold, from the point of view of Nessus, in Juggler of Worlds.

"The Soft Weapon" has been included in the short story collections Neutron Star (1968) and Playgrounds of the Mind (1991).

== Plot ==
Nessus is returning from a diplomatic mission to the Outsiders, having purchased what is apparently a Thrint stasis box, on a passenger ship run by a human couple, Jason and Anne Marie Papandreou.

They stop at Beta Lyrae to sight-see where they unexpectedly discover, by deep-radar, another stasis box. However, the box had been placed there as a trap by Kzinti pirates. The rogue Kzinti are using a dummy stasis box to lure ships that they detect to be in possession of stasis boxes. The Kzinti capture the crew and open the looted stasis box, which is revealed to be a Tnuctipun stasis box, not Thrintun. Stasis boxes (which are rare) often contain advanced technological products of immense military value. The Kzinti hope to use the contents of the box to develop weapons technology that will allow them to wage wars of conquest.

The box contains a Tnuctipun weapon which is capable of morphing into several devices, none of which is deemed useful by the Kzinti as a war weapon. However, one setting, an energy absorber, causes a Kzinti restraint field to fail, allowing Jason and Nessus to escape with the weapon. While free, Jason manages to discover a hidden setting for a matter-to-energy conversion beam, which is far more powerful than anything possessed by either human or Kzinti. Although Nessus remains free, Jason and the weapon are recaptured by the Kzinti.

The Kzinti, desperate to know how to access the hidden setting, threaten Jason's wife in an attempt to get him to divulge it, but he refuses. Her life is spared when the device, which is intelligent (and loyal to its long-extinct Tnuctipun masters), begins to speak. The Kzinti converse with the weapon, believing that they are getting knowledge of how to access the setting. However, the weapon, believing itself to have fallen into the possession of an enemy, tricks the Kzinti into activating a self-destruct mechanism. The Kzinti are killed, but the humans survive, in part thanks to technology used by the Kzinti to restrain them as prisoners, inadvertently protecting them from the blast and impact. Nessus then frees the humans and the three of them leave the planet.

== Timeline note ==
This story itself contains clues which set it prior to the short story "Flatlander", specifically the apparent naming of the planet on which events take place as "Cue Ball" by Anne Marie ("I dub thee 'Cue Ball'"). In Flatlander, Gregory "Elephant" Pelton attempts to name their new-found planet "Cue Ball", but Bey tells him that that name is already taken by a Beta Lyrae planet. In the official timeline, as well as Juggler of Worlds, however, this story is set after the events of Flatlander.

== Adaptations ==
Niven adapted the story and retitled it "The Slaver Weapon" for a 1973 episode of Star Trek: The Animated Series. It was his second pitch for the show, after his original idea was rejected; the rejected idea later became Niven's novelette "The Borderland of Sol".

"The Slaver Weapon" script was in turn adapted by Alan Dean Foster as a chapter of the book Star Trek Log Ten.
