= The Jigsaw Man =

- Short story by Larry Niven
- Country: America
- Language: English
- Genre: Science fiction

Publication
- Published in: Dangerous Visions
- Publication type: anthology
- Publisher: Doubleday
- Media type: Print (Hardcover)
- Publication date: 1967

"The Jigsaw Man" is a science fiction short story by American writer Larry Niven, set in the Known Space universe. The story was first published in Harlan Ellison's anthology Dangerous Visions, and is included in Niven's collections All the Myriad Ways and Tales of Known Space.

== Plot summary ==
In the future, criminals convicted of capital offenses are forced to donate all of their organs to medicine, so that their body parts can be used to save lives and thus repay society for their crimes. However, high demand for organs has inspired lawmakers to lower the bar for execution further and further over time.

The protagonist of the story, certain that he will be convicted of a capital crime, but feeling that the punishment is unfair, escapes from prison and decides to do something really worth dying for. He vandalizes the organ harvesting facility, destroying a large amount of equipment and harvested organs, but when he is recaptured and brought to trial, this crime does not even appear on the charge sheet, as the prosecution is already confident of securing a conviction on his original offense: repeated traffic violations.

== Reception ==
Algis Budrys criticized the story's "false basic premise", stating that although Niven implied that the story's premise could occur soon, despite widespread shortages terminally ill people's blood was not being extracted. He concluded that "Niven looks a little ridiculous this time ... [it] is neither good lecture nor good story".

In early 2023, the State of Massachusetts considered a bill to allow Massachusetts prisoners to donate organs and/or bone marrow to hospitals - with some speculation this would be encouraged, in exchange for earning time off their sentence. As of May 2024, the bill is still in committee.
