= Neutron Star (short story collection) =

Collection of short stories by Larry Niven

Cover of the first edition, published by Ballantine Books.

Neutron Star is a collection of science fiction short stories by American writer Larry Niven, published in April 1968. The individual stories were published in If and Galaxy Science Fiction in 1966–1967, under Frederik Pohl as editor.

== Contents ==
The book contains the following eight stories:

- "Neutron Star"
- "A Relic of the Empire"
- "At the Core"
- "The Soft Weapon"
- "Flatlander"
- "The Ethics of Madness"
- "The Handicapped"
- "Grendel"

All stories are set in Niven's Known Space universe.

== Reception ==
Algis Budrys praised the collection, saying that it was evidence that "quality rises above fashion".
