= Inconstant Moon =

1971 science fiction short story collection by Larry Niven

- First edition
- Author: Larry Niven
- Series: Known Space (some)
- Genre: Science fiction
- Publisher: Victor Gollancz Ltd (hc), Sphere Books (pb)
- Publication date: 1973
- Publication place: United Kingdom
- Media type: Print (hardback & paperback)
- Pages: 200
- ISBN: 0-575-01586-1
- OCLC: 741687
- Dewey Decimal: 813/.5/4
- LC Class: PZ4.N734 In3 PS3564.I9

Inconstant Moon is a science fiction short story collection by American author Larry Niven that was published in 1973. "Inconstant Moon" is also a 1971 short story that is included in the collection. The title refers to "O, swear not by the moon, th' inconstant moon", a quote from the balcony scene in William Shakespeare's Romeo and Juliet. The collection was assembled from the US collections The Shape of Space and All the Myriad Ways.

== Story synopses (Sphere paperback edition) ==
The 1974 Sphere paperback version of the collection only contained seven of the twelve stories originally included in the 1973 Gollancz hardback edition.

=== "Inconstant Moon" ===
First appearance: 1971 short story collection All the Myriad Ways. The short story won the 1972 Hugo Award for best short story.

Stan, the narrator, notices that the Moon is glowing much brighter than ever before. The people he meets as the story begins all praise the Moon's increased beauty but lack the scientific background to understand its cause. However the narrator surmises that the Sun has gone nova, the day side of the Earth is already destroyed, and this is the last night of his life. He then calls and visits his girlfriend Leslie, presuming her ignorant of the situation, but she realizes it independently when Jupiter brightens with appropriate delay; they then enjoy their last night on the town, before rain and winds start.

Later, he realizes one other possibility. In case he is right, they find appropriate supplies and seek refuge from the coming natural disasters in Leslie's high-rise apartment. The second possibility turns out to be correct: the Earth has "merely" been struck by an enormous superflare—by far the worst disaster in human history, with most (if not all) people in the Eastern Hemisphere presumed dead, but humans in the Americas have a chance of surviving the cataclysm. The vaporized seawater leads to torrential rains, hurricanes and floods. The story ends at the break of an overcast, gray morning, with Leslie's apartment becoming an island among the raging flood waters, but with the narrator rather optimistically wondering "if our children would colonize Europe, or Asia, or Africa."

In 1996, the story was made into an episode of The Outer Limits television series written by Brad Wright.

Jo Walton in 1997 wrote a short poem, "The End of the World in Duxford", as "an unauthorised version of 'Inconstant Moon', a British equivalent."

=== "Bordered in Black" ===
First appearance: The Magazine of Fantasy & Science Fiction, April 1966.

A prototype faster-than-light spacecraft crewed by two men is sent to the Sirius system, known from robotic exploration to include a terrestrial world. In orbit around the world, they notice that one of the continents has a thin, strange border all the way around its coastline, which radiates a low heat and appears black in visible light. After exploring the edges of the smaller continents, and discovering that the ocean hosts only one lifeform—a single species of algae that they think might have been genetically engineered—they decide to explore the large continent with the border.

When they discover just what the black border is—a seething mass of trapped humans with very dark skin, feeding off the algae and each other—the result is the death, by suicide, of one of the crew, and the self-destruction of the ship by the traumatized survivor upon his return to Earth—and a chilling reminder that there may be great danger waiting for further human explorers. The story ends on a hopeful note, with the project leader believing that Earth can help the humans at Sirius, and a fearful one, with the crewman then speculating that the humans were seeded by carnivorous aliens as food animals.

In the notes to his collection Convergent Series, Niven wrote that "Bordered in Black"

does not belong to the Known Space universe. (...) When I wrote Bordered in Black, Known Space had not taken form. I was playing with some preliminary ideas, and one of these – the "Blind Spot" effect of this form of faster-than-light travel – was later incorporated into Known Space. But it's a different timeline entirely. Similar statements hold for "One Face" (...) Hair styles and human colony worlds from this story later entered Known Space; but the story does not belong to that universe.

=== "How the Heroes Die" ===
First appearance: Galaxy Science Fiction, October 1966. A Known Space story.

The 15-man team setting up the first base on Mars experience tragedy when a murder is committed. Carter, the homophobic murderer, in the process of escaping on one of the transportation buggies crashes through the plastic bubble which holds in the base's atmosphere in an attempt to kill everyone else; however, it fails, and he is soon chased by Alf, the brother of the victim on another buggy. Carter had committed the murder because the victim had asked Carter for homosexual sex. Alf suggests to Carter that he himself is in denial about his own homosexuality.

The lethal chase, with the two combatants in constant radio communication, slowly reveals the community stresses which resulted in the murder. Alf wants to kill Carter in revenge for his brother, while Carter wishes the same and to try once more to destroy the base; but with limited oxygen in their tanks, the two men must ensure that they have enough left to return to base.

=== "At the Bottom of a Hole" ===
This story appeared originally on Galaxy Science Fiction, in December 1966. It is a Known Space story.

A sequel to "How the Heroes Die". Muller, a smuggler with a cargo of precious magnetic monopoles, attempts to use Mars (the 'hole' of the title; to spacers, planets are merely gravity wells to be avoided if possible) as a means to whip his ship to a new orbit that will enable him to escape the customs authorities who are chasing him. His plan fails, and he crashlands, close to the now-abandoned base. Over the next few days, he explores the ruins and finds out the terrible story of what happened. Unfortunately, he himself suffers the same fate as the original colonists—all of which he commits to his log, which is later recovered.

The two Mars stories do belong to "Known Space" and they are specifically referred to and to some degree influence the plot of Protector, which takes place a long time later. Also, the failure of Mars colonization as depicted here contributes to the generally held opinion in that future history that planets (at least in the Solar System) are virtually worthless and it is asteroids which are the truly desirable real property.

=== "One Face" ===
First appearance: Galaxy Science Fiction, June 1965.

During a routine hyperspace jump, an accident involving a small meteoroid striking into the machinery causes the ship to be trapped in a stasis until billions of years have passed. They emerge in the Solar System's far future, at which time the sun has become a greenish-white dwarf and Earth has lost its atmosphere and become a tidally locked world; i.e., it only presents one face to the sun. The ship's main computer has also been damaged, so its decision to have the captain replaced by one of the passengers to maximize survival causes disagreement. The damage to the ship prevents it traveling faster than light, and the passengers and crew debate using the ship's remaining sub-light engine to travel relativistically to a neighboring star to look for a more viable planet.

Reluctantly, believing that any other similarly senescent star will offer no better option, the people accede to the new captain's order to land on Earth despite the lack of an atmosphere. However, this is not a haphazard decision by the new captain, who is an astrophysicist. He is convinced that there is a remnant atmosphere frozen on the dark side, and uses the ship's drive to begin to re-spin Earth (the drive really is powerful enough to achieve this within a reasonable timescale, if only the planet's crust can withstand the seismic stresses without catastrophic earthquakes.) This will, he hopes, convert this frozen gas back to a breathable atmosphere.

=== "Becalmed in Hell" ===
First appearance: The Magazine of Fantasy & Science Fiction, July 1965. A Known Space story.

A ship with a two-man crew—Howie, a normal human, and Eric, the disembodied brain of a seriously injured man who has been installed in the ship to serve as a living computer and control system—is exploring the upper atmosphere of Venus, using the empty fuel-tank as a dirigible device.

About to return to Earth, Eric reveals that something is wrong with the ramjet that propels the craft, necessitating a landing in order to fix the problem. When Howie can find nothing physically wrong with the system, he can only conclude that, disturbingly, the problem is with Eric. He believes Eric has a psychosomatic disorder preventing him from operating the ramjets, using the analogy of a traumatized soldier who can no longer feel his hand and pull the trigger of a gun.

After revealing his theory to Eric, Eric admits it is a possibility but insists that Howie keep inspecting the ship, reasoning that Howie is the only one who can check for mechanical problems. Howie agrees, but secretly has convinced himself that the problem is truly with Eric.

In an effort to cure Eric using a placebo, Howie creates buckets of ice-water using the ship's freezer, and dumps it into the wiring panels on the wings, telling Eric that the heat and pressure of Venus might be affecting the ship's function. Eric regains the use of the ramjets and the pair manage to escape from Venus and back to Earth.

On the trip back, Howie reveals his ruse to Eric. Eric insists that the cause was mechanical, and challenges Howie to a $5,000 bet that the problem will be found back on Earth. Howie accepts the bet. Back on Earth, the mechanics determine that, indeed, it was a mechanical problem due to the pressure of Venus's atmosphere.

"Becalmed in Hell" was nominated for the 1965 Nebula Award for best short story.

=== "Death by Ecstasy" ===
First appearance: Galaxy Science Fiction, January 1969 (as "The Organleggers"). A Known Space story, first of "Gil the Arm" line.

Asteroid miner Owen Jennison is found dead in an apartment on Earth, apparently of suicide: He was a wirehead, directly stimulating the pleasure center of the brain, and starved.

Gil Hamilton, an operative of the United Nations Police (and friend of Owen's) must solve what appears to be a classic locked room mystery: he does not believe that Owen was the type to turn wirehead or commit suicide, so the death must have been planned by somebody else.

His investigations lead him to people associated with organlegging – the illicit handling and sale of spare body-parts. Eventually, Gil is captured by the organlegging gang, until, under threat of being harvested alive for his organs, his "third arm" - a psychologically limited form of psychokinesis – allows him to kill his captor in spite of being completely bound.

The title, a play on the tradition of murder mysteries, is a reference to the story's investigators speculating about the experience of being electrocuted through the pleasure centre of the brain:

Had his death been momentary Hell, or all the delights of paradise in one singing jolt? Hell, I hoped, but I didn't believe it.

"Death by Ecstasy" was adapted as a graphic novel by Bill Spangler, Terry Tidwell, and Steve Stiles in 1991.

The story is part of the “Known Space” series, where the political and cultural differences between Earth humans and those of the asteroid belt are an important recurring theme. It is one of a group of Known Space stories in which Niven speculates on the effect on human culture of simple universal organ transplants:

Every voter had a bit of the organlegger in him. In voting the death penalty for so many crimes, the lawmakers had only bent to pressure from the voters. There was a spreading lack of respect for life, the evil side of transplant technology.

== Additional story synopses (Gollancz hardback edition) ==
The original 1973 Gollancz hardback edition (ISBN 0-575-01586-1) included five stories that were omitted from the Sphere paperback edition:

=== "Wait It Out" ===
First appearance: The Future Unbounded Program Book, 1968.

=== "Not Long Before the End" ===
First appearance: The Magazine of Fantasy and Science Fiction, April 1969.

Part of The Magic Goes Away "mana" series.

=== "Passerby" ===
First Appearance: Galaxy Magazine, September 1969.

=== "The Deadlier Weapon" ===
First appearance: Ellery Queen's Mystery Magazine, June 1968.

=== "Convergent Series" ===
First appearance (under the original title, "The Long Night"): The Magazine of Fantasy and Science Fiction, March 1967.
