= The Ringworld Engineers =

1979 novel by Larry Niven

- First edition
- Author: Larry Niven
- Cover artist: Paul Lehr
- Language: English
- Series: Ringworld storyline from Known Space
- Genre: Science fiction
- Publisher: Phantasia Press
- Publication date: 1979
- Publication place: United States
- Media type: Print (hardback & paperback)
- Pages: 355
- ISBN: 0-932096-03-4
- OCLC: 5286215
- Dewey Decimal: 813/.5/4
- LC Class: PZ4.N734 Rj PS3564.I9
- Preceded by: Ringworld
- Followed by: The Ringworld Throne

The Ringworld Engineers is a 1979 science fiction novel by American writer Larry Niven. It is the first sequel to Niven's Ringworld and was nominated for both the Hugo and Locus Awards in 1981.

== Origin ==
In the introduction to the novel, Niven says that he never planned to write more than one Ringworld novel, but that he did so, in a large part, due to fan support. Firstly, the popularity of Ringworld resulted in a demand for a sequel. Secondly, many fans had identified numerous engineering problems in the Ringworld as described in the novel. The first major problem was that the Ringworld, being a rigid structure, was not actually in orbit around the star it encircled and would eventually drift, resulting in the entire structure colliding with its sun and disintegrating. In the novel's introduction, Niven says that MIT students attending the 1971 World Science Fiction Convention chanted, "The Ringworld is unstable! The Ringworld is unstable!" Niven says that one reason he wrote The Ringworld Engineers was to address these engineering problems.

== Plot summary ==
The Hindmost, recently deposed leader of the Puppeteers, abducts the human Louis Wu (who has become a wirehead) and the Kzin Chmeee (previously known as "Speaker-to-Animals"). Both had been part of the original Ringworld expedition. The Hindmost hopes to acquire Ringworld technology, specifically matter transmutation, to help him regain his position.

Once they reach the Ringworld, Louis and Chmeee are sent out to explore, while the Hindmost remains safely behind on their starship. Louis and Chmeee secretly plot to try to overthrow the Hindmost so they can go home. In their travels, they meet a number of the hominid species that have evolved on the Ringworld. They also learn more about the full-scale "maps" of various known space worlds, including Earth, Mars and Kzin.

They discover that the Ringworld has become unstable and will collide with its star soon. The Ringworld's builders, revealed to be Pak Protectors, have long since died out, and the attitude jets they installed all around the rim to maintain the Ringworld's position were dismounted to use as starship engines. Chmeee goes to the Kzin map for his own goals, while Louis tries to find some way to save the trillions of inhabitants.

It is on the Map of Mars that the reunited party (and two natives) finds the Ringworld control room Louis is seeking, located in a vast maze of rooms in the hollow space under the map. To create the rarefied atmosphere on Mars, the Map of Mars was built 20 miles (32 km) above the main surface, creating a 1,120,000,000-cubic-mile (4.7×10^{9} km^{3}) cavity. The control room contains living space and, among other things, the meteor defense system. The defense system uses the superconductor grid embedded in the Ringworld's scrith floor to manipulate the magnetic field of the Ringworld's sun to trigger stellar flares that power a titanic gas laser. (The first expedition to the Ringworld crashed after their ship was hit by this laser.)

They encounter Teela Brown, a human member of the first expedition who had chosen to remain on Ringworld. She and her lover Seeker had, in the course of their travels, stumbled upon "Tree-of-Life" plants. The smell of the plant drove them to eat its roots; Teela was turned into a Pak Protector, with superhuman intelligence and strength, but Seeker died, being too old to undergo the transformation. As a Pak Protector, Teela has little control of her actions; her protective instincts force her to try to save all of the Ringworld inhabitants. This causes a dilemma. She knows of a way to save the Ringworld, but it would entail killing 5% of the people. This she cannot do. She manages to lure Louis and the others to where they can save the other 95%. Her instincts make her fight them, but she does so half-heartedly so that they can kill her.

Afterward, Louis figures out what to do. Teela had restored starship engines to their original purpose as attitude jets, but only had enough for 5% of the ring. Louis explains that the meteor defense system can generate a massive stellar flare (normally used to power the laser weapon) to provide twenty times more fuel to the attitude jets to move the Ringworld back into position. However, the radiation from the flare will be fatal to everything and everyone living on that section of the Ringworld. The actual task is carried out by the Hindmost, who is far superior at operating the control systems (and can safely pass through a Tree-of-Life plantation en route to the control center, as Louis cannot).

Having earlier destroyed the hyperdrive to force the Hindmost to cooperate, Louis is stranded. He and the rest of his party look for some place to settle down, while the Hindmost remains aboard the disabled (but very safe) starship to think things over.

== References to other Known Space works ==
Apart from the obvious references to the preceding novel Ringworld, The Ringworld Engineers also draws upon ideas elaborated in Niven's 1973 novel Protector for Teela Brown's ultimate fate.

== Publication history ==
- 1979, USA, Galileo Magazine, 4 part serialization July 1979, September 1979, November 1979, January 1980
- 1979, USA, Phantasia Press, ISBN 0-932096-03-4, Boxed edition, limited to 500 copies
- 1980, USA, Holt, Rinehart, and Winston, ISBN 978-0-03-021376-2, Hardcover
- 1981, USA, Ballantine Books ISBN 978-0-345-26009-3, Paperback
- 1985, USA, Ballantine Books ISBN 978-0-345-33430-5, Pub Date 12 November 1985, Paperback
- 1997, USA, Ballantine Books ISBN 978-0-345-41841-8, Pub Date 23 June 1997, Paperback
- 1992, UK, Orbit Books ISBN 978-1-85723-111-3, Pub Date 12 Aug 1992, Paperback

== Reception ==
The Chicago Sun-Times wrote, "For new readers, there's fascinating adventure in plenitude. For old fans of Niven's Known Space series, or of the original volume, there are all the fine, characteristic touches that delight us Niven fans, and which support his reputation for uncommon wittiness and fast narrative pace."

Thomas M. Wagner of SFreviews.net reviewed the book in 2001 and gave it a 4 out of 5 rating. Wagner rated it higher than the first book. He found some of the storytelling outdated but overall praised Niven for "a consummate professional's skill at balancing imagination and science harmoniously."

Kirkus Reviews commented that the author "commands an impressive vein of invention, but his plotting here is limp and threadbare."
