= Juggler of Worlds =

2008 science fiction novel by Niven & Lerner

- First edition
- Author: Larry Niven and Edward M. Lerner
- Cover artist: Stephan Martinière
- Language: English
- Series: Known Space
- Genre: Science fiction
- Publisher: Tor Books
- Publication date: September 16, 2008
- Publication place: United States
- Media type: Hardcover
- Pages: 352
- ISBN: 0765318261
- OCLC: 185033391
- Dewey Decimal: 813/.54 22
- LC Class: PS3564.I9 J84 2008
- Preceded by: Fleet of Worlds
- Followed by: Destroyer of Worlds

Juggler of Worlds (2008) is a science fiction novel by American writers Larry Niven and Edward M. Lerner, a sequel to their Fleet of Worlds.

It is set in the Known Space universe. Most of the book revisits earlier stories (the Beowulf Shaeffer stories in Crashlander and Neutron Star from the points of view of Sigmund Ausfaller and several Pierson's Puppeteers; "The Soft Weapon", another story in Neutron Star; and parts of the previous novel in the series, Fleet of Worlds, from the point of view of Nessus). The novel also severely revises the established knowledge of the Outsider race. The final quarter of the book returns to the setting of and is a sequel to Fleet of Worlds.
