= Known Space =

Fictional universe created by Larry Niven

- Author: Larry Niven and others
- Country: United States
- Language: English
- Genre: Science fiction
- Published: December 1964 – present

Known Space is the fictional setting of about a dozen science fiction novels and several collections of short stories by American writer Larry Niven. It has also become a shared universe in the spin-off Man-Kzin Wars anthologies. The Internet Speculative Fiction Database (ISFDB) catalogs all works set in the fictional universe that includes Known Space under the series name Tales of Known Space, which was the title of a 1975 collection of Niven's short stories. The first-published work in the series, which was Niven's first published piece, was "The Coldest Place", in the December 1964 issue of If magazine, edited by Frederik Pohl. This was the first-published work in the 1975 collection.

The stories span approximately one thousand years of future history, from the first human explorations of the Solar System to the colonization of dozens of nearby systems. Late in the series, Known Space is an irregularly shaped "bubble" about 60 light-years across.

The epithet "Known Space" refers to a small region in the Milky Way galaxy, centered on Earth. In the future that the series depicts, spanning roughly the third millennium, humans have explored this region and colonized many of its worlds. Contact has been made with other species, such as the two-headed Pierson's Puppeteers and the aggressive felinoid Kzinti. Stories in the Known Space series include events and places outside of the region called "Known Space" such as the Ringworld, the Pierson's Puppeteers' Fleet of Worlds and the Pak homeworld.

The Tales were originally conceived as two separate series, the Belter stories set roughly from 2000 to 2350 CE and the Neutron Star / Ringworld stories set in 2651 CE and later. The earlier, Belter period features solar-system colonization and slower-than-light travel with fusion-powered and Bussard ramjet ships. The later, Neutron Star, period features faster-than-light ships using "hyperdrive". Niven implicitly joined the two settings as a single fictional universe in the short story "A Relic of the Empire" (If, December 1966), by using background elements of the Slaver civilization from the Belter series as a plot element in the faster-than-light setting. In the late 1980s—having written almost no Tales of Known Space in more than a decade—Niven opened the 300-year gap in the Known Space timeline as a shared universe, and the stories of the Man-Kzin Wars volumes fill in that history, bridging the two settings.

== Locations ==
One aspect of the Known Space universe is that most of the early human colonies are on planets suboptimal for Homo sapiens. During the first phase of human interstellar colonization (i.e. before humanity acquired FTL), simple robotic probes were sent to nearby stars to assess their planets for habitation. The programming of these probes was flawed: they sent back a "good for colonization" message if they found a habitable point, rather than a habitable planet. Sleeper ships containing human colonists were sent to the indicated star systems. Too often, those colonists had to make the best of a bad situation.

=== Solar System ===
- Earth, the human homeworld, is ruled by the United Nations, a direct democracy, but not a utopia. An important organization is the ARM, a global police force tasked to deal with organlegging and crimes committed by cutting-edge technologies. For centuries, due to the perfection of organ transplant technology, all state executions were done in hospitals to provide organ transplants, and to maximize their availability nearly all crimes carried the death penalty, including such offenses as multiple traffic tickets or tax evasion. This period ended when Jack Brennan, who had consumed the Tree-of-Life root and become a human version of the Pak Protector, used his superior intelligence to engineer social change in medical technology and social attitudes that eventually reduced the use of organ banks to reasonable levels. Part of Brennan's manipulation was the development of a science known as "psychistry". Psychistry was used to "correct" all forms of "mental aberration" – the populace is extremely docile. To combat overpopulation (one estimate is 18 billion people), a license is required to procreate, only available after exhaustive testing has determined that a prospect is free of "abnormalities"; unlicensed procreation is a capital crime. This policy, in addition to the existence of the transfer booth and a one-world language and economy, has led to the populace eventually becoming fairly genetically homogeneous. To prevent the development of new WMDs, all scientific research is regulated by the government and potentially dangerous technology is suppressed. Due to such suppression, Earth has had fewer real breakthroughs in science than would be expected. A common title for people born on Earth is "Flatlander"; having been born and raised in the only environment in Known Space to which humans are well-adapted, they are considered naïve and a bit helpless by humans from colony worlds.
- The Moon is a separate entity, with its own distinct culture but is under the control of the same government as Earth. Humans native to the Moon are called "Lunies", and tend toward tall, lean body types regularly reaching eight feet in height. They are frequently referred to as looking much like Tolkien's Elves due to their physiques and alien allure.
- Mars, fourth planet in the Solar System and the first planetary colony in Known Space. Native "Martians" were exterminated by the Brennan genocide. No one goes there, as resources are easier to mine in the Belt and Jovian moons. Earth ultimately colonized Mars specifically to study the descent landing pod used by Phssthpok the Pak in 2124 AD and the research colony was still in existence in 2183 when the Martians were exterminated by Brennan. The colony expanded greatly during the first Man–Kzin war 2367–2433.
- The Sol Belt possesses an abundance of valuable ores, which are easily accessible due to the low to negligible gravity of the rocks containing them. Originally a harsh frontier under U.N. control, the Belt declared independence after creating Confinement Asteroid, a habitat with spin gravity that permitted safe gestation of children, and Farmer's Asteroid, the Belt's primary food source. Almost immediately a lively competition began between the fiercely independent "Belters" and the technology police of the U.N. Several years of tension and economic conflicts followed, but soon settled into a relatively peaceful trade relationship as the Belt has so many resources that the UN and the Earth need.
- Mercury is also a colony world with a small number of inhabitants, used mainly for mining and as a gravitational anchor for orbiting solar power stations which beam power to the more remote colonies using gigantic lasers. At the time of the First Man–Kzin War, human society is so pacifistic that no weapons exist; those who are able to even contemplate killing another sentient being or constructing a weapon for that purpose are regarded as mental aberrations and must take drugs to control their thoughts. However, an enormous laser, whether constructed as a weapon or not, makes a highly effective one, and it is strongly implied that the existence of the Mercury power satellites is a large part of what enabled Sol System to hold off the Kzinti in the early part of the war.

=== Other planets ===
- Down is the home world of the Grogs and a former Kzinti colony. It orbits "L5-1668", a faint, cool M-type star, significantly redder and cooler than Sol and 12.3 light-years from it. Down is made habitable in part because of its large moon, Sheila. Grogs, though friendly, are feared by humanity, due to their telepathic ability to control the minds of animals (and possibly sentient species as well). Because of this fear, humans have placed a Bussard ramjet field generator in close orbit around Down's sun, thus enabling them to destroy the Grog population should they ever take hostile action against any sentient species.
- Jinx, orbiting Sirius A, is a massive moon of a gas giant (called Primary), stretched by tidal forces into an egg shape and tidally locked. It has habitable areas but has high surface gravity of 1.78 times Earth, near the limits of human extended tolerance. The points nearest to and farthest from Primary (called the "East" and "West" ends) lie elevated out of the atmosphere in vacuum. The atmosphere of the belt-region halfway between them is too dense and too hot to breathe, and is inhabited only by the Bandersnatchi. The zones between the vacuum areas and the high-density belt area have atmosphere breathable by humans. Jinx's "East" and "West" ends become a major in vacuo manufacturing area. Jinxian humans are short and squat, the strongest bipeds in Known Space. They tend to die early, from heart and circulatory problems. There is a tourist industry which provides substantial useful interplanetary trade credits for the Bandersnatchi, who allow themselves to be hunted by humans under strict protocols.
- Wunderland is a planet circling Alpha Centauri, and was the earliest extra-solar colony in Known Space's human history. It has a surface gravity of 60% that of Earth's and is hospitable to human life. Wunderland was invaded and its population enslaved by the Kzinti during the first Man–Kzin War. It was freed near the end of the First War by the human Hyperdrive Armada from We Made It. The system has an asteroid belt in the shape of a crescent, which gives it its name–the Serpent Swarm. The capital asteroid, Tiamat, houses one of the largest Kzin populations in Known Space.
- We Made It, orbiting Procyon A, got its name because the first colony ship crash-landed. Gravity is about three-fifths Earth's. The planet's axis is pointed along the plane of its ecliptic (like Uranus), creating ferocious winds on the order of 500 mph (800 km/h) during half of the planet's year, forcing the people to live underground. Natives are known as "Crashlanders", tend to be very tall, and many are albinos. Their capital, which was the site of their colony ship's landing, is called Crashlanding City. We Made It also has viscous, algae-choked "oceans" and a big icy moon, ironically named Desert Isle.
- Plateau in the Tau Ceti system is Venus-like, with a plateau (called Mount Lookitthat), half the size of California, rising high enough out of the dense atmosphere to be habitable. Inhabitants ("Mountaineers") are divided into two rigid hereditary castes, the "crew" and the "colonists", depending on whether their ancestors piloted the colonizing vessel. The crew are the upper caste, and hold power through their monopoly on organ transplantation and control of the police. The original colonists signed the "Covenant of Planetfall", agreeing that this outcome was just recompense for the labors of the crew during the voyage; that they signed at gunpoint as they were awakened from hibernation is kept secret from later generations, and also that those who refused, died. This repressive system is overthrown in A Gift From Earth, and the former inequality and caste system appears to have disappeared by the time The Ethics of Madness takes place.
- Home orbits the star Epsilon Indi, about 12 light years from Earth. The planet received its name because of its remarkable similarity to Earth; its day is nearly 24 hours long and its surface gravity is a comfortable 1.08 g. Oceans, mean global temperature, seasons, and moon (Home's moon is called Metaluna, but is often referred to as "the Moon" by Homers) are also similar. According to Protector, the original colonists had planned to call their world "Flatland" as a sort of joke, but once settled on Home they had changed their minds—"a belated attack of patriotism", Elroy Truesdale of Protector muses. The entire population of Home is secretly destroyed as a consequence of Brennan's and Truesdale's war with the Pak—Brennan turns the entire population into human Protectors to create an army to fight the Pak invaders. Home is resettled quickly though, since another ramjet with colonists is already on its way when the colony "fails". In Procrustes and other later stories, Home is once again presented as a vibrant colony.
- Canyon was once an uninhabitable Mars-like world known as Warhead. It is the second of seven planets around p Eridani A, 22 light-years from Earth. It was used as a military outpost by the Kzinti, until the planet was hit by a weapon called the "Wunderland Treatymaker" during the Third War. The attack tore a long, narrow, kilometers-deep crater into the crust approximately the size of the Baja Peninsula. The air and moisture in the thin atmosphere gathered at the bottom of this artificial canyon, creating a breathable environment, complete with a sea at the bottom. The planet was then renamed for the crater, and settled by humans in a huge city running up the crater wall. Archaic (hyper-aggressive and intractable) Kzinti were entombed in stasis field shells during the attack and are still beneath the lava, and someday, somebody will have to deal with them. The attack by the Wunderland Treatymaker is detailed as a part of Destiny's Forge by Paul Chafe, a part of the Man–Kzin Wars shared universe.
- Gummidgy is a jungle world popular with hunters. It is home to the Gummidgy Orchid-Thing, a sessile carnivore which hangs from trees and is a popular trophy for the wealthy. It orbits CY Aquarii, a blue giant SX Phoenicis variable star; due to the resulting high levels of ultraviolet light, most humans (except Jinxians) require melanin-boosting medication to venture outdoors.
- Fafnir is a former Kzin colony covered almost entirely in water. When under Kzinti control it was called Shasht, a Kzin word meaning "burrowing murder". It was captured by humans during the Man–Kzin Wars. Humans and Kzinti now cohabitate. The humans prefer to live on the coral islands while the Kzinti prefer the single large continent which they continue to call Shasht.
- Margrave is a late addition to the family of Human colonies. In the Ringworld era it is still a frontier world, and is home to enormous birds the inhabitants have dubbed "rocs". It orbits Lambda Serpentis (27 Serpentis), a G0 star 34.7 light-years from Earth. It is named after its discoverer, J. Margrave Julland.
- Silvereyes is, at the time of Ringworld, the furthest Human world from Earth (21.3 light-years, 60 days at Quantum-I hyperdrive speeds), orbiting Beta Hydri. In Niven's obscure story The Color of Sunfire it has entire continents covered with Slaver sunflowers (bred as defense for Thrint manors, they focus sunlight using silver leaves as parabolic reflectors), giving it an appearance from orbit of having "silver eyes". The Man–Kzin Wars books, conversely, have it entirely covered by a world ocean, with groves of sunflowers growing up from the bottom of the ocean. The Ringworld Roleplaying Game describes it as an ocean planet dotted with island shield volcanoes.
- Hearth is the homeworld of the Pierson's Puppeteers. With a population of around one trillion, it is covered by arcologies, most over one mile tall. Its industries and population generate so much waste heat it no longer requires a star for warmth (the four other "farmworlds", simply named "Nature Preserves" or NP1, NP2, etc., use artificial orbital lights to grow food). Together these five planets (with a sixth added later, as detailed in Fleet of Worlds) are often referred as the Fleet of Worlds and do not orbit any star, but use Outsider-manufactured drives to move in order to flee the galactic core explosion discovered by Beowulf Schaeffer. They orbit about each other in a Klemperer rosette.
- Kobold was a tiny artificial world created in the outer Sol system by Jack Brennan, a human Protector, composed of a small sphere of neutronium in the center ringed by a larger torus. Gravity generators facilitated movement between the two sections and were used in games and art. Brennan destroyed Kobold just prior to leaving for his war with the Pak Protectors.
- The Ringworld is an artificial world structure with three million times the surface area of Earth, built in the shape of a giant ring circling its sun, a million miles wide and with a diameter of 186 million miles. It was built by the Pak, who either abandoned it, or more likely died out much as the Earth Pak did, due to a lack of the Tree-of-Life, a yamlike root which produces the conversion to Protector-stage Pak (which required a very specifically targeted soil chemistry to grow). It is inhabited by a number of different evolved hominid species, and includes representative samples of Bandersnatchi, Martians and Kzinti, and possibly other alien races that existed at the time of its construction.
- Sheathclaws is a planet colonized by humans aboard Angel's Pencil and descendants of a rogue Kzin telepath. It orbits an as-yet-unspecified star 98 light-years from Earth, and kept its existence secret for several centuries. The Patriarchy would dearly love to capture the entire population of potential Telepaths and press them into service.
- Kzin (so called by Humans) is the homeworld of the Kzinti. Its name in the Hero's Tongue translates as "Home-of-the-Kzinti" or "Kzinhome". It orbits 61 Ursae Majoris and has higher gravity than Earth and more oxygen in the atmosphere. It has two moons, known as the Hunter's Moon and the Traveler's Moon.
- Cue Ball is an uninhabitable ice world orbiting Beta Lyrae.
- Jm'ho is a moon similar to Europa, homeworld to the Gw'oth. It orbits a gas giant called Tl'ho. The star is simply called G567-X2 in the Puppeteers' catalogue
- Kl'mo is a Gw'oth colony founded by Ol't'ro. Not much is explained about this world, except that it seems very primitive and has a very strong gravity.
- Oceanus is a primitive world briefly surveyed by the crew of Explorer in Fleet of Worlds.

== Technology ==
The series features a number of "superscience" inventions which figure as plot devices. Stories earlier in the timeline feature technology such as Bussard ramjets and drouds (wires capable of directly stimulating the pleasure centers of the brain), and explore how organ transplantation technology enables the new crime of organlegging (as well as the general sociological effects of widespread transplant technology), while later stories feature hyperdrive, invulnerable starship hulls, stasis fields, molecular monofilaments, transfer booths (teleporters used only on planetary surfaces), the lifespan-extending drug boosterspice, and the tasp which is an extension of the droud which works without direct contact.

=== Boosterspice ===
"Boosterspice" is a compound that increases the longevity and reverses aging of human beings. With the use of boosterspice, humans can easily live hundreds of years and, theoretically, indefinitely.

Developed by the Institute of Knowledge on Jinx, it is said to be made from genetically engineered ragweed (although early stories have it ingested in the form of edible seeds). In Ringworld's Children, it is suggested boosterspice may actually be adapted from Tree-of-Life, without the symbiotic virus that enabled hominids to metamorphose from Pak Breeder stage to Pak Protector stage (mutated Pak breeders were the ancestors of both Homo sapiens and the hominids of the Ringworld).

On the Ringworld, there is an analogous (and apparently more potent) compound developed from Tree-of-Life, but they are mutually incompatible; in The Ringworld Engineers, Louis Wu learns that the character Halrloprillalar died when in ARM custody after leaving the Ringworld, as a result of having taken boosterspice after having used the Ringworld equivalent. Boosterspice only works on Homo sapiens, whereas the Tree-of-Life compound will work on any hominid descended from the Pak.

=== Hyperdrive ===
Faster-than-light (FTL) propulsion, or hyperdrive, was obtained from the Outsiders at the end of the First Man–Kzin War. In addition to winning the war for humanity, it allowed the re-integration of all the human colonies, which were previously separated by distance. Standard (Quantum I) hyperdrive covers a distance of one light-year every three days (121.75 c). A more advanced Quantum II hyperdrive introduced later is able to cover the same distance in one and a quarter minutes (420,768 c).

In Niven's first novel, World of Ptavvs, the hyperdrive used by the Thrintun required a ship to be going faster than 93% of the speed of light. However, this is the only time that hyperdrive is described this way.

In the vast majority of Known Space material, hyperdrive requires that a ship be outside a star's gravity well to use. Ships which activate hyperdrive close to a star are likely to disappear without a trace. This effect is regarded as a limitation based on the laws of physics. In Niven's novel Ringworld's Children the Ringworld itself is converted into a gigantic Quantum II hyperdrive and launched into hyperspace while within its star's gravity well. Ringworld's Children reveals that there is life in hyperspace around gravity wells and that hyperspace predators eat spaceships which appear in hyperspace close to large masses, thus explaining why a structure as large as the Ringworld can safely engage the hyperdrive in a star's gravity well.

One phenomenon travelers in hyperspace can experience is the so-called 'blind spot' should they look through a porthole or camera screen, giving the impression that the walls around the porthole or sides of the camera view screen are expanding to 'cover up the outside'. The phenomenon is the result of hyperspace being so fundamentally different from normal/'Einsteinian' space that a traveler's senses cannot truly comprehend it, and instead the observer 'sees' a form of nothingness that can be hypnotic and dangerous. Staring too long into the 'blind spot' can be insanity-inducing, so as a precaution all view ports on ships are blinded when a ship enters hyperspace.

=== Invulnerable hulls ===
The Puppeteer firm, General Products, produces a series of invulnerable starship hulls, known simply as the General Products hull. The hulls are impervious to any type of matter or energy, with the exception of antimatter (which destroys the hull, as demonstrated in "Flatlander"), gravitation (demonstrated in "Neutron Star"), and visible light (which passes through the hull). While invulnerable themselves, this is no guarantee that the contents are likewise protected. For example, though a high speed impact with the surface of a planet or star may cause no harm to the hull, the occupants will be crushed if they are not protected by additional measures such as a stasis field (Ringworld) or a gravity compensating field.

In Fleet of Worlds, the characters tour a General Products factory and receive clues that allow them to destroy a General Products hull from the inside using only a high-powered interstellar communications laser. In Juggler of Worlds, the Puppeteers, attempting to surmise how this was done without antimatter, identify another technique which can be used to destroy the otherwise invulnerable hulls, one which does suggest some potential defense options.

The strength of the hulls was revealed to be based on the fact that they were essentially one giant molecule.

=== Organ transplantation ===
On Earth in the mid-21st century, it became possible to transplant any organ from any person to another, with the exception of brain and central nervous system tissue. Individuals were categorized according to their so-called "rejection spectrum" which allowed doctors to counter any immune system responses to the new organs, allowing transplants to "take" for life. It also enabled the crime of "organlegging" which lasted well into the 24th century.

=== Stasis fields ===
A Slaver stasis field creates a bubble of spacetime disconnected from the entropy gradient of the rest of the universe. Time slows effectively to a stop for an object in stasis, at a ratio of some billions of years outside to a second inside. An object in stasis is invulnerable to anything occurring outside the field, as well as being preserved indefinitely. A stasis field may be recognized by its perfectly reflecting surface, so perfect that it reflects 100% of all radiation and particles, including neutrinos. However one stasis field cannot exist inside another. This is used in World of Ptavvs where humans develop a stasis field technology and realize that a mirrored artifact known as the Sea Statue must be actually an alien in a stasis field. They place it with a human envoy, who is a telepath, and envelop both in field. By doing this, they unleash the last living member of the Slaver species on the world.

=== Stepping disks ===
Stepping disks are a teleportation technology. They were invented by the Pierson's Puppeteers, and their existence is not generally known to other races until the events of The Ringworld Engineers.

The stepping disks are an outgrowth and improvement of the transfer booth technology used by humans and other Known Space races. Unlike the booths, the disks do not require an enclosed chamber, and somehow can differentiate between solid masses and air, for example. They also have a far greater range than transfer booths, extending several astronomical units.

Several limitations to stepping disks are mentioned in the Ringworld novels. If there is a difference in velocity between two disks, any matter transferred between them must be accelerated by the disk accordingly. If there is not enough energy to do so, the transfer cannot take place. This becomes a problem with disks that are a significant distance apart on the Ringworld's surface, as they will have different velocities: same speed, different direction.

=== Transfer booths ===
Transfer booths or displacement booths are an inexpensive form of teleportation. Short-range booths are similar in appearance to an old style telephone booth: one enters, "dials" one's desired destination, and is immediately deposited in a corresponding booth at the destination. Longer-range booths operate similarly, but are housed in former airports due to requiring "equipment to compensate for the difference in rotational velocity between different points on the Earth". They are inexpensive: a trip anywhere on Earth costs only a "tenth-star" (presumably equivalent to a dime). Introduced by one of Gregory Pelton's ancestors, apparently bought from, and based on, Puppeteer technology.

"A displacement booth was a glass cylinder with a rounded top. The machinery that made the magic work was invisible, buried beneath the booth. Coin slots and a telephone dial were set into the glass at sternum level" (from Flash Crowd).

=== Paranormal abilities ===
Some individuals in the stories display limited paranormal or "psionic" abilities. Gil Hamilton can move objects with his mind using his phantom arm, which he gained after losing an arm in an asteroid mining accident. When he finally had the arm replaced from an organ bank on Earth, the ability persisted. "Plateau Eyes" (introduced in A Gift From Earth) is an ability on the part of some to hide in plain sight, by causing others not to notice them. Population control is tight on Earth, but these abilities can gain the possessor a license to have more children. The Pierson's Puppeteers engineer a lottery for child licenses on Earth to increase the occurrence of "luck", which they think is a paranormal ability humans have that has enabled them to defeat races such as the Kzinti. In Ringworld, the character Teela Brown is said to have this ability (although possibly not to the same extent as others who avoided being included in the expedition).

== Organizations ==
The ARM is the police force of the United Nations. ARM originated as an acronym for "Amalgamation of Regional Militia", though this is not a term in current usage by the time of the Known Space novels. An agent of the ARM, Gil Hamilton, is the protagonist of Niven's science fictional detective stories, a series-within-a-series gathered in the collection Flatlander. (Confusingly, "Flatlander" is also the name of an unrelated Known Space story.)

Their basic function is to enforce mandatory birth control on overcrowded Earth, and restrict research which might lead to dangerous weapons. In short, the ARM hunts down women who have illegal pregnancies and suppresses all new technologies. They also hunt organleggers, especially in the era of the "organ bank problem". Among the many technologies they control and outlaw are all trained forms of armed and unarmed combat. By the 25th century, ARM agents were kept in an artificially induced state of paranoid schizophrenia to enhance their usefulness as law enforcement officials, which led to them sometimes being referred to as "Schizes". Agents with natural tendencies toward paranoia were medicated into docility during their off duty hours, through the aforementioned science of psychistry (see Madness Has Its Place and Juggler of Worlds).

Their jurisdiction is limited to the Earth-Moon system; other human colonies have their own militia. Nevertheless, in many Known Space stories, ARM agents operate or exert influence in other human star systems through the "Bureau of Alien Affairs" (see "In the Hall of the Mountain King", "Procrustes", "The Borderland of Sol", and "Neutron Star"). These interventions begin following the Man-Kzin Wars and the introduction of hyperdrive, presumably as part of a general re-integration of human societies.

== Stories in Known Space ==
The Tales of Known Space were first published primarily as short stories or serials in science fiction magazines. Generally the short fiction was subsequently released in one or more collections and the serial novels as books. Some of the shorter novels (novellas) published in magazines were expanded as, or incorporated in, book-length novels. (Note: The 1968 and 1975 collections Neutron Star and Tales of Known Space contain 21 distinct stories, 19 of which were among those 22 in the series that were originally published by the end of 1968. The three other early stories had been expanded into books published by 1973. The 1975 collection contains two post-1968 stories (as well as some 1975 nonfiction) and a fourth novel, Ringworld (1970), was "original" beyond the published stories. See ISFDB.) There are also two or three short stories which share common themes and some background elements with Known Space stories, but which are not considered a part of the Known Space universe: "One Face" (1965) and "Bordered in Black" (1966)—both in the 1979 collection Convergent Series—and possibly "The Color of Sunfire", published online and listed here.

In the Known Space stories, Niven had created a number of technological devices (GP hull, stasis field, Ringworld material) which, combined with the "Teela Brown gene", made it very difficult to construct engaging stories beyond a certain date—the combination of factors made it tricky to produce any kind of creditable threat/problem without complex contrivances. Niven demonstrated this, to his own satisfaction, with "Safe at Any Speed" (1967). He used the setting for much less short fiction after 1968 and much less for novels after two published in 1980. Late in that decade, Niven invited other authors to participate in a series of shared-universe novels, with the Man–Kzin Wars as their setting. The first volume was published in 1988.

Stories written by Larry Niven in the Tales of Known Space series
Title	Published	First appearance	Collection (Note: Many of the stories appeared in more than one subsequent collection, which may not all be listed here. See ISFDB.)
"The Coldest Place"	1964 (December)	Worlds of If	Tales of Known Space
"World of Ptavvs" (Note: "World of Ptavvs" (March 1965) was expanded as the novel World of Ptavvs (August 1966). See ISFDB.)	1965	Worlds of Tomorrow	Three Books of Known Space
"Becalmed in Hell"	1965	The Magazine of Fantasy and Science Fiction	Tales of Known Space, All the Myriad Ways, Playgrounds of the Mind
World of Ptavvs	1966	(novel)	Three Books of Known Space
"Eye of an Octopus"	1966	Galaxy Magazine	Tales of Known Space
"The Warriors"	1966	Worlds of If	Tales of Known Space, Man-Kzin Wars I
"Neutron Star"	1966	Worlds of If	Neutron Star, Crashlander
"How the Heroes Die"	1966	Galaxy Magazine	Tales of Known Space
"At the Core"	1966	Worlds of If	Neutron Star, Crashlander
"A Relic of the Empire"	1966	Worlds of If	Neutron Star, Playgrounds of the Mind
"At the Bottom of a Hole"	1966	Galaxy Magazine	Tales of Known Space
"The Soft Weapon"	1967	Worlds of If	Neutron Star, Playgrounds of the Mind
"Flatlander"	1967	Worlds of If	Neutron Star, Crashlander
"The Ethics of Madness"	1967	Worlds of If	Neutron Star
"Safe at any Speed"	1967	The Magazine of Fantasy and Science Fiction	Tales of Known Space
"The Adults" (Note: "The Adults" (June 1967) was incorporated into the novel Protector (Sep 1973). See ISFDB.)	1967	Galaxy Magazine	Protector
"The Handicapped"	1967	Galaxy Magazine	Neutron Star
"The Jigsaw Man"	1967	Dangerous Visions	Tales of Known Space
"Slowboat Cargo" (Note: "Slowboat Cargo" (serial, February–April 1968) was expanded as the novel A Gift from Earth (Sep 1968). See ISFDB.)	1968	Worlds of If	A Gift from Earth
"The Deceivers" (later titled "Intent to Deceive")	1968	Galaxy Magazine	Tales of Known Space
"Grendel"	1968	(collection only)	Neutron Star, Crashlander
"There Is a Tide"	1968	Galaxy Magazine	Tales of Known Space, A Hole in Space
A Gift from Earth	1968	(novel)	Three Books of Known Space
"Wait It Out"	1968	Future Unbounded convention program	Tales of Known Space
"The Organleggers" (later titled "Death by Ecstasy")	1969 (January)	Galaxy Magazine	The Shape of Space, The Long ARM of Gil Hamilton, Flatlander
Ringworld	1970	(novel)	—
"Cloak of Anarchy"	1972	Analog Science Fiction	Tales of Known Space, N-Space
Protector	1973	(novel)	—
"The Defenseless Dead"	1973	Ten Tomorrows	Flatlander, The Long ARM of Gil Hamilton, Playgrounds of the Mind
"The Borderland of Sol"	1975	Analog Science Fiction	Tales of Known Space, Crashlander, Playgrounds of the Mind
"ARM"	1975	Epoch	The Long ARM of Gil Hamilton
The Ringworld Engineers	1979	(novel)	—
The Patchwork Girl	1980	(novel)	Flatlander
"Madness Has Its Place"	1990	Isaac Asimov's Science Fiction Magazine	Man-Kzin Wars III, Three Books of Known Space
Inconstant Star	1991	(fix-up novel)	The Man-Kzin Wars (Part One), Man-Kzin Wars III (Part Two)
"The Color Of Sunfire"	1993	Worldcon 51 convention program ("Bridging the Galaxies")	Bridging the Galaxies
"Procrustes"	1993	Worldcon 51 convention program ("Bridging the Galaxies")	Crashlander
"Ghost"	1994	(collection only, as frame story)	Crashlander
"The Woman in Del Rey Crater"	1995	(collection only)	Flatlander
The Ringworld Throne	1996	(novel)	—
"Choosing Names"	1998	(collection only)	Choosing Names: Man-Kzin Wars VIII
"Fly-By-Night"	2000	Asimov's Science Fiction	Man-Kzin Wars IX
Ringworld's Children	2004	(novel)	—
"The Hunting Park"	2005	(collection only)	Man-Kzin Wars XI
Fleet of Worlds (Edward M. Lerner and Niven, coauthors)	2007	(novel)	—
Juggler of Worlds (Lerner and Niven)	2008	(novel)	—
Destroyer of Worlds (Lerner and Niven)	2009	(novel)	—
Betrayer of Worlds (Lerner and Niven)	2010	(novel)	—
Fate of Worlds (Lerner and Niven)	2012	(novel)	—
"Sacred Cow" (Larry Niven and Steven Barnes, coauthors)	2022	Analog Science Fiction	—

Ringworld (1970) won the annual Nebula, Hugo, and Locus best novel awards. Protector (1973) and The Ringworld Engineers (1980) were nominated for the Hugo and Locus Awards.

== Playground ==
Niven has described his fiction as "playground equipment", encouraging fans to speculate and extrapolate on the events described. Debates have been made, for example, on who built the Ringworld (Pak Protectors and the Outsiders being the traditional favorites, but see Ringworld's Children for a possibly definitive answer), and what happened to the Tnuctipun. Niven also states that this is not an invitation to violate his copyrights, warning potential publishers and editors not to proceed without permission.

Niven was also reported to have said that "Known Space should be seen as a possible future history told by people that may or may not have all their facts right."

The author also published an "outline" for a story which would "destroy" the Known Space Series (or more precisely, reveal much of the Known Space background to be an in-universe hoax), in an article entitled "Down in Flames". Although the article is written as though Niven intended to write the story, he later wrote that the article was only an elaborate joke, and he never intended to write such a novel. The article itself notes that the outline was made obsolete by the publication of Ringworld. "Down in Flames" was a result of a conversation between Norman Spinrad and Niven in 1968, but at the time of its first publication in 1977 some of the concepts were invalidated by Niven's writings between 1968 and 1977. (A further edited version of the outline was published in N-Space in 1990.)

== Awards ==
Year	Award	Category	Work	Result	Ref.
1966	1965 Nebula Awards	Best Short Story	"Becalmed in Hell"	Nominated	
1966	1965 Nebula Awards	Best Short Story	"Wrong-Way Street"	Nominated	
1967	1967 Hugo Awards	Best Short Story	"Neutron Star"	Won	
1968	1967 Nebula Awards	Best Novelette	"Flatlander"	Nominated	
1968	1968 Hugo Awards	Best Short Story	"The Jigsaw Man"	Nominated	
1971	1970 Nebula Awards	Best Novel	Ringworld	Won	
1971	1971 Hugo Awards	Best Novel	Ringworld	Won	
1971	1971 Locus Awards	Best Novel	Ringworld	Won	
1972	1972 Ditmar Awards	Best International Fiction	Ringworld	Won	
1974	1974 Locus Awards	Best Novella	"The Defenseless Dead"	6	
1974	1974 Locus Awards	Best Novel	Protector	4	
1974	1974 Hugo Awards	Best Novel	Protector	Nominated	
1975	1975 Ditmar Awards	Best International Fiction	Protector	Won	
1975	1975 Locus Poll	Best All-Time Novel	Ringworld	12	
1976	1976 Hugo Awards	Best Novella	"ARM"	Nominated	
1976	1976 Hugo Awards	Best Novelette	"The Borderland of Sol"	Won	
1976	1976 Locus Awards	Best Novella	"The Borderland of Sol"	3	
1976	1976 Locus Awards	Best Novella	"ARM"	5	
1976	1976 Locus Awards	Best Single Author Collection	Tales of Known Space	4	
1979	1979 Seiun Awards	Best Translated Long Form	Ringworld	Won	
1980	1980 Locus Awards	Best SF Novel	The Ringworld Engineers	24	
1981	1981 Locus Awards	Best SF Novel	The Ringworld Engineers	3	
1981	1981 Hugo Awards	Best Novel	The Ringworld Engineers	Nominated	
1981	1981 Locus Awards	Best Novella	The Patchwork Girl	2	
1981	1981 Seiun Awards	Best Translated Short Form	"A Relic of the Empire"	Won	
1987	1987 Locus Poll	Best All-Time SF Novel	Ringworld	9	
1989	1989 Locus Awards	Best Anthology	The Man–Kzin Wars	4	
1992	1992 Locus Awards	Best Anthology	Man–Kzin Wars IV	6	
1995	1995 Locus Awards	Best Collection	Crashlander	4	
1997	1997 Locus Awards	Best SF Novel	The Ringworld Throne	14	
1998	1998 Locus Poll	Best All-Time SF Novel before 1990	Ringworld	25	
2001	2001 Locus Awards	Best Novella	"Fly-by-Night"	7	
2008	2008 Prometheus Awards	Best Novel	Fleet of Worlds by Larry Niven and Edward M. Lerner	Nominated	
2012	2012 Locus Poll	Best 20th Century SF Novel	Ringworld	15	
2012	2012 Locus Poll	Best 20th Century Novelette	"Neutron Star"	29	
2013	2013 Locus Awards	Best SF Novel	Fate of Worlds by Larry Niven and Edward M. Lerner	22	

== See also ==
- List of Known Space characters, including alien species
