= Fate of Worlds =

2012 science fiction novel by Larry Niven and Edward M. Lerner

- First edition
- Author: Larry Niven, Edward M. Lerner
- Cover artist: Stephan Martiniere
- Language: English
- Series: Fleet of Worlds
- Genre: science fiction
- Publication date: 2012
- Publication place: USA
- Media type: print and ebook
- Pages: 317
- ISBN: 978-0765366498
- OCLC: 760974750
- Dewey Decimal: 813/.54
- LC Class: PS3564.I9 F38 2012
- Preceded by: Betrayer of Worlds Ringworld's Children

Fate of Worlds: Return From the Ringworld is a science fiction novel by American writers Larry Niven and Edward M. Lerner. It was first published in hardcover and ebook editions by Tor Books in August 2012, with paperback and trade paperback editions following from the same publisher in July 2013 and June 2014, respectively. It is the fifth and final book in the Fleet of Worlds series, itself a subset of Niven's Known Space series.

== Summary ==
Fate of Worlds opens as Ringworld's Children (part of the Ringworld series) closes, decades after Betrayer of Worlds, the prior book in the Fleet of Worlds series. The novel thus concludes both series, and involves characters from both. After the disappearance of the Ringworld, the Fleet of Worlds' Puppeteers are targeted by rival war fleets, giving the exiled Puppeteer leader the Hindmost, who is familiar with Ringworld technology, the opportunity to regain his position.
