= Destroyer of Worlds (novel) =

2009 science fiction novel by Niven & Lerner

- Cover of the first edition.
- Author: Larry Niven and Edward M. Lerner
- Cover artist: Stephan Martinière
- Language: English
- Series: Known Space
- Genre: Science fiction
- Publisher: Tor Books
- Publication date: November 10, 2009
- Publication place: United States
- Media type: Hardcover
- Pages: 368
- ISBN: 0-7653-2205-6
- OCLC: 317928753
- Preceded by: Juggler of Worlds
- Followed by: Betrayer of Worlds

Destroyer of Worlds is a science fiction novel by American writer Larry Niven and Edward M. Lerner, set in the Known Space series. It is a sequel to their previous novels, Fleet of Worlds and Juggler of Worlds. It is set ten years after Juggler of Worlds, drawing heavily from Protector, but, like the rest of the series, can stand alone.

The plot involves New Terra and the Puppeteers (and the Gw'oth) entering into conflict with a Pak Protector fleet (though not the fleets featured in Protector). It also resolves why Alice Jordan's knowledge about the Pak never entered later novels, and restates the known timeline of the Home conversion to a planet of Protectors.
