= A Gift from Earth =

1968 novel by Larry Niven

A Gift From Earth
- First edition
- Author: Larry Niven
- Language: English
- Series: Known Space Universe
- Genre: Science fiction
- Published: 1968
- Publisher: Ballantine Books
- Publication place: United States
- Media type: Print (hardback & paperback)
- Pages: 254
- ISBN: 978-0-345-24509-0

A Gift From Earth is a science fiction novel by American writer Larry Niven, first published in 1968 and set in his Known Space universe. The novel was originally serialized as Slowboat Cargo.

== Plot summary ==
Plateau, a colony in the Tau Ceti system, was settled by humans some 300 years before the plot begins. The colony world itself is a Venusian-type planet with a dense, hot, poisonous atmosphere. It would be otherwise uninhabitable, except for a tall monolithic mesa that rises 40 miles (64 km) up into a breathable layer in the upper atmosphere. This gives the planet a habitable area about half the size of California. The Captain of the first colony vessel named the feature Mount Lookitthat (from his interjection at first sight of it), and the colony became known as Plateau.

After landing the slower-than-light ships, the Crew sign an agreement, called the Covenant of Planetfall, with their former passengers (who had just emerged from suspended animation and were in a weak bargaining position). This agreement gives the Crew (and their descendants in perpetuity) all control over the new colony. A system of medical care evolves, in which organ transplantation is the only method of treatment, even for cosmetic defects (such as baldness); a justice system evolves, based on the Hospitals in the two immense "slowboat" spacecraft which had brought their ancestors to the planet; all crimes are punishable by death, followed by involuntary donation of the perpetrator's transplantable organs (including skin, scalp, and teeth). Only Colonists are arrested for crimes, and only Crew are eligible to receive transplants, except as a rarely granted privilege in return for service to the Crew. Some Colonists become dissatisfied with the system and form a dissident group called the "Sons of Earth".

The prologue of the story begins with a dissident Colonist escaping Implementation, the local police force, by jumping to his death over the "void edge", the 40-mile (64 km) high cliff that forms the sides of the mesa. On Mount Lookitthat, all crimes are punished by being dissected for spare parts. Thus, this is considered to be the greatest of crimes, as it leaves nothing to harvest.

An automated Bussard ramjet arrives from Earth, carrying an unknown cargo of great importance, which the government finds and conceals, but not before the cargo has been observed and photographed by Polly, an agent of the Sons of Earth.

Meanwhile, Matthew Keller, an ordinary miner, is invited to a party and drawn into a conversation about psi powers. Matt strikes up a flirtatious conversation with Polly, but she suddenly loses interest. Angered, Matt hooks up with a woman named Laney and is having sex with her (his first time) when Implementation agents raid the house, which turns out to be full of Sons of Earth members. Matt escapes in a stolen car. The Implementation chase him to the edge of the Plateau, where he dives into the poisonous gas. Implementation leaves him for dead, but he survives and resurfaces.

Feeling guilty, he tries to enter the Hospital where the captured Sons of Earth have been taken and rescue Laney. He has several strange encounters with Implementation where they suddenly fail to be able to see him. He makes his way to the Vivarium, where the Sons of Earth who are still living are being kept, and sets them free. He, along with two of the leaders and Laney, steal a car and flees to the home of Millard Parlette, a prominent political figure and direct descendant of the captain of the original colony vessel.

Matt explains how he rescued them and they conclude that he has a psionic power: the ability to influence the optic nerves of anyone whose attention is focused on him. When he is excited or frightened, people focused on him are compelled to contract the pupils of their eyes, and thereby lose that focus to the point of short-term memory loss – even if he has just threatened them with a weapon.

When Millard Parlette returns home, he allows himself to be captured by Matt with little difficulty. However, the others overreact upon seeing him enter the house and knock him out with a stun gun. Matt and Laney leave to go back to the hospital. Matt intends to rescue Polly, having realized that her rejection of him was an outcome of his nervousness and psionic power. Laney intends to rescue the rest of the Sons of Earth who were recaptured.

In the house, Millard Parlette reveals that the cargo of the ramship consisted of four medical breakthroughs: a symbiote that regenerates skin, technology to culture a human liver, another to culture a human heart, and a second symbiote that lives in the bloodstream, fighting disease, dissolving blood clots, repairing and cleaning fatty deposits from the circulatory system, and maintaining hormone levels at those of an adult. These advancements are amazingly beneficial, but that is the precise problem. Colonists, once they learn of them, would assume that the organ banks had become obsolete, and expect Implementation to disband. However, these advancements only reduce the need for transplants; they do not remove it entirely. If Implementation continues to take colonists to the banks, they would assume that necessity had given way to malevolence. Every colonist on Plateau would revolt. At least half the population would perish in the conflict, and technological civilization might come to an end. Thus, the political figure Parlette wants to negotiate a replacement for the Covenant of Planetfall with the rebels in advance, and prevent such a conflict.

Though the rebels are willing to make a deal, there is still one significant problem: Implementation. Any settlement with the Colonists would involve reducing the power of the Crew's police force. Implementation would therefore be on the side of the conservative Crew faction: those who would die before accepting a compromise with those they currently hold the power of life and death over. Implementation controls the best weapons on Plateau, and have already made a decision as to the impact of the ramscoop's cargo.

At the hospital, Implementation leader Jesus Pietro Castro has been interrogating Polly, enraging her by explaining that Implementation permitted the Sons of Earth to exist solely as a constant source of organ donors – thinning it periodically as if it was a herd of husbanded animals. His "father" was over seventy when he was conceived, and required supplementary testosterone; instead of periodic injections, he chose to be transplanted with the testicles of an executed Colonist – the class schism between Colonist and Crew means that the two have effectively become distinct races, both of which consider miscegenation a greater taboo than incest. The revelation that Jesus is half-Colonist disgusts her even more than the revelation that she and her fellow Colonists are nothing but cattle to the Crew; cattle that have just been completely culled. As the ramship cargo has sharply banked the need for organ transplants, the decision was made to eliminate the resistance entirely, knowing that they would revolt violently once the cargo was revealed. Every other Son of Earth has been broken up for organ stock. Polly and the four who escaped in the car hidden under the residence are the only surviving rebels on Plateau.

Meanwhile, Matt and Laney are able to enter the facility with no real problem. Matt tricks Castro into leading him to where they are keeping Polly, and Matt sets her free. But Implementation moved from psychological interrogation to sensory deprivation, and she is now insane. He has sex with her and in so doing restores her ability to function. But when she learns of their location, she becomes determined to avenge the genocide of the Sons of Earth. She flees Matt, intending to detonate the nuclear reactor on one of the slowboats, to destroy the Hospital and kill as many Crew as she can. She is unable to reach the reactor and settles for the ship's long-defunct control room. She ignites the ship's landing motors; this severely damages the Hospital, kills many of the crew, and thrusts the ship off the "void edge" to its destruction. Matt jumps from the ship before she does so.

Millard Parlette assumes control of the Crew in the aftermath. However, the Colonists have won the war, as the Sons of Earth have claimed control of the most powerful weapon on Plateau: Matt Keller. If the Crew does not restructure Plateau's laws along cosmopolitan lines, Keller will use his psychic power to act as an unstoppable assassin. Keller accepts this, but demands a position of power among the rebels. He has just discovered a new wrinkle in his power: not only can he compel someone to lose focus on him, he can compel someone to intensify that focus, putting them in a hypnotic trance, which makes him the true master of Plateau.

As the story began with a robot ramship in flight, it ends with another ramship headed from Earth to the human colony known as 'We Made It' (in the Procyon system) with the same discovery. This ship is observed by alien Outsiders, who follow it in hopes of selling faster than light technology to the locals. This sale will lead to the advanced multi-species society portrayed in "Neutron Star" and Ringworld.

== Reception ==
Algis Budrys praised the novel as "an example of the best currently available technologically oriented SF," but faulted the lack of balance between Niven's social commentary and his storytelling.
