= Thallium oxide =

Thallium has several oxides:

- Thallium(I) oxide Tl_{2}O
- Thallium(III) oxide Tl_{2}O_{3}
- Thallium(I) superoxide or thallium dioxide TlO_{2}
- Tl_{4}O_{3}
