= Betrayer of Worlds =

2010 science fiction novel by Larry Niven and Edward M. Lerner

- Cover of the first edition.
- Author: Larry Niven and Edward M. Lerner
- Cover artist: Stephan Martinière
- Language: English
- Series: Known Space
- Genre: Science fiction
- Publisher: Tor Books
- Publication date: October 2010
- Publication place: United States
- Media type: Hardcover
- Pages: 320
- ISBN: 0-7653-2608-6
- OCLC: 317928753
- Preceded by: Destroyer of Worlds
- Followed by: "There is a Tide"

Betrayer of Worlds is a science fiction novel by American writers Larry Niven and Edward M. Lerner, set in the Known Space series. It is a sequel to their previous novels Fleet of Worlds, Juggler of Worlds, and Destroyer of Worlds. Set 70 years before Ringworld, it features returning character Nessus, a young Louis Wu, and the rapidly evolving Gw'oth civilization posing a potential threat to the puppeteer Concordance.
