= Edward M. Lerner =

American novelist

- Born: 1949 (age 76–77); United States
- Occupations: Writer, novelist
- Writing career
- Language: English
- Period: 1991–present
- Genres: Science fiction, techno-thriller, popular science, hard science fiction
- Notable awards: Canopus Award (2015)
- Website: edwardmlerner.com

Edward M. Lerner (born 1949) is an American author of science fiction, techno-thrillers, and popular science.

As of 2023 he has twenty-five published books: thirteen solo novels (three in his InterstellarNet universe), six collections, five novels co-authored with Larry Niven in the Known Space universe, and one popular-science book. The majority of Lerner's shorter works were originally published in Analog, The Grantville Gazette, and (until it ceased publication) Jim Baen's Universe.

His 2001 short story "Grandpa?" was made into a short film, The Grandfather Paradox, and shown at the 2006 Balticon Science Fiction convention where it won the Best Film Award. It was also a semi-finalist at the 2006 Science Fiction Short Film Festival.

== Biography ==
For over thirty years Edward M. Lerner worked in the aerospace and information technology industries while writing science fiction part-time. He held positions at numerous companies such as Bell Labs, Hughes Aircraft, Honeywell, and Northrop Grumman. In February 2004, after receiving a book deal for Moonstruck, he decided to write science fiction full-time.

== Recognition ==
Lerner's novel InterstellarNet: Enigma won the inaugural (2015) Canopus Award for long-form fiction (i.e., novels) "honoring excellence in interstellar writing." He also won the annual "Anlab" (Analog Readers Poll) for nonfiction in 2013, for "Faster Than a Speeding Photon: The Why, Where, and (Perhaps the) How of Faster-Than-Light Technology" and for short story in 2018, for "Paradise Regained"," among his many Anlab nominations. His fiction has also been nominated for Locus, Prometheus, and Hugo awards.

== Bibliography ==
=== Novels ===
- Probe, 1991, ISBN 978-0595011391.
- Moonstruck, 2005, ISBN 978-0743498852.
- Fools' Experiments, 2008, ISBN 0765319012.
- Small Miracles, 2009, ISBN 978-0765320940.
- Energized, 2012, ISBN 978-0765328496.
- Dark Secret, 2016, ISBN 978-1612423227.
- The Company Man, 2019, ISBN 978-1948818537 (novelization of four stories previously published in the Grantville Gazette).
- Déjà Doomed, 2021, ISBN 978-1647100278.
- On the Shoals of Space-Time, 2023, ISBN 978-1649731395
- Life and Death on Mars, 2023, ISBN 978-1647100889

Fleet of Worlds series (with Larry Niven)

- Fleet of Worlds, 2007, ISBN 978-0765318251.
- Juggler of Worlds, 2008, ISBN 978-0765318268.
- Destroyer of Worlds, 2009, ISBN 978-0765322050.
- Betrayer of Worlds, 2010, ISBN 978-0765326089.
- Fate of Worlds, 2012, ISBN 978-0765331007.

InterstellarNet series

- InterstellarNet: Origins, 2010, ISBN 978-0981848747.
- InterstellarNet: New Order, 2010, ISBN 978-0981848754.
- InterstellarNet: Enigma, 2015, ISBN 978-1936771646.

=== Short fiction ===
Collections

- Creative Destruction, published 2006, Wildside Press, ISBN 978-0809557479.
- Contents: "The Day of the RFIDs"
- "Survival Instinct"
- "What a Piece of Work Is Man"
- "By the Rules"
- "Iniquitous Computing"
- "Catch a Falling Star"
- "Settlement"
- "Creative Destruction"
- Countdown to Armageddon / A Stranger in Paradise, published 2010, Wildside Press, ISBN 978-1434406743.
- Frontiers of Space, Time, and Thought: Essays and Stories on The Big Questions, published 2012, FoxAcre Press, ISBN 978-1936771370.
- Muses & Musings: A Science Fiction Collection, published 2019, Phoenix Pick, ISBN 978-1612424408.
- The Sherlock Chronicles & The Paradise Quartet, published 2021, Eric Flint Ring of Fire Press, ISBN 978-1953034809.
- The Best of Edward M. Lerner, published 2022, ReAnimus Press, ISBN 979-8447246174.

List of stories (Note: Short stories unless otherwise noted.)

Title	Year	First published	Reprinted/collected	Series	Notes
What a piece of work is Man	1991	"What a piece of work is Man". Analog Science Fiction and Fact. February 1991.			
Unplanned-for Flying Object	1994	"Unplanned-for Flying Object". Analog Science Fiction and Fact. September 1994.			
The Matthews Conundrum	2013	"The Matthews Conundrum". Analog Science Fiction and Fact. 133 (11): 73–103. November 2013.		InterstellarNet	Novella
Championship b'tok	2014	"Championship b'tok". Analog Science Fiction and Fact. 134 (9): 80–103. September 2014.		InterstellarNet	Novelette
Soap opera	2016	"Soap opera". Analog Science Fiction and Fact. 136 (4): 37–49. April 2016.			Novelette

- "Settlement", Analog, January 2001.
- "Grandpa?", Analog, July/August 2001.
- "Presence of Mind", Analog, February 2002.
- "Iniquitous Computing", Analog, July/August 2002. Also contained in the collection Creative Destruction.
- "Survival Instinct", Analog, October/November 2002. Also contained in the collection Creative Destruction. This story is a sequel to Presence of Mind.
- "By the Rules", Analog, June 2003.
- "A Matter of Perspective", Artemis, Winter 2003.
- "Moonstruck", Analog, September – December 2003. Published in book form in 2005.
- "The Day of the RFIDs", Future Washington (2005).
- "Great Minds", Jim Baen's Universe, October 2006.
- "RSVP", Darker Matter, March 2007.
- "Chance of Storms", Jim Baen's Universe, April 2007.
- "Copywrong", Darker Matter, June 2007.
- "At the Watering Hole", Jim Baen's Universe, August 2007.
- "Countdown to Armageddon", Jim Baen's Universe, October 2007 through October 2008. Published in book form in 2010.
- "Inside the Box", Asimov's, February 2008.
- "The Night of the RFIDs", Analog, May 2008.
- "Where Credit is Due". Analog Science Fiction and Fact. 128 (10): 74–75. October 2008.
- "Small Business". Analog Science Fiction and Fact. 129 (1&2): 84–95. January–February 2009.
- "No GUTs, No Glory", Jim Baen’s Universe, August, 2009.
- "A Time for Heroes". Analog Science Fiction and Fact. 130 (6): 73–77. June 2010.
- "Blessed Are the Bleak", Analog, April 2011.
- "Energized", Analog, June – October 2011. Published in book form in 2012.
- "Unplanned Obsolescence". Probability Zero. Analog Science Fiction and Fact. 133 (1&2): 104–105. January–February 2013.
- "Time out". Analog Science Fiction and Fact. 133 (1&2): 152–179. January–February 2013.
- "Dark Secret – part I of IV". Analog Science Fiction and Fact. 133 (4): 8–38. April 2013. Published in book form (all four parts) in 2016.
- "Dark Secret – part II of IV". Analog Science Fiction and Fact. 133 (5): 66–103. May 2013.
- "Dark Secret – part III of IV". Analog Science Fiction and Fact. 133 (6): 72–104. June 2013.
- "Dark Secret – part IV of IV". Analog Science Fiction and Fact. 133 (7&8): 158–184. July–August 2013.
- "Tour de Force", Impossible Futures (2013).
- "There's an App for That", Sci Phi Journal, July 2015.
- "I Clink, Therefore I Am", Sci Phi Journal, November 2015.
- "Judy Garland Saves the World (And I Don’t Mean Oz)", Deco Punk (2015).
- "Turing de Force", Science Fiction by Scientists (2016).
- "The Torchman's Tale", Galaxy's Edge, January 2017.
- "Nothing to Lose?", Galaxy's Edge, May 2017.
- "A Visit to the Network Control Center", Sci Phi Journal, May 2017.
- "Too Deep Thought", Galaxy's Edge, July 2017.
- "My Fifth and Most Exotic Voyage", Analog, September/October 2017.
- "The Pilgrimage", Analog, November/December 2017.
- "Harry and the Lewises", Analog, September/October 2018.
- "Clockwork Cataclysm", Analog, January/February 2019.
- "I've Got the World on a String", Galaxy's Edge, January 2019.
- "Sock It to Me", Grantville Gazette, March 2021.
- "Relatively Speaking", Galaxy's Edge, January 2022.
- "Soldier of Fortune", Shapers of Worlds IV, (2024).
- "The Dark at the End of the Tunnel", Analog, May/June 2024.
- "In the Slime of Life", Tales of Galactic Pest Control, (2025).
- "The Grandfather Paranoia", Black Cat Weekly #241, (April 2026).

InterstellarNet stories (Note: See additional entries in table of stories above.)

(Following are the original short-fiction and serial appearances; see above for subsequent novelizations.)

- "Dangling Conversations", Analog, November 2000.
- "Creative Destruction", Analog, March 2001. Also included in the collection Creative Destruction.
- "Hostile Takeover", Analog, May 2001.
- "Strange Bedfellows", Artemis, Science and Fiction for a Space-Faring Age, Winter 2001.
- "A New Order of Things", Analog, May–September 2006.
- "Calculating Minds", Jim Baen's Universe, April 2009.

Company Man stories

- "The Company Man", Grantville Gazette (Universe Annex), May 2017.
- "The Company Dick", Grantville Gazette (Universe Annex), September 2017.
- "The Company Mole", Grantville Gazette (Universe Annex), November 2018 thru January 2019.
- "The Company Bane", Grantville Gazette (Universe Annex), March 2019 thru May 2019.

Paradise stories

- "A Stranger in Paradise", Jim Baen's Universe, February 2007.
- "Paradise Regained", Analog, January/February 2017.
- "The Gates of Paradise", Analog, May/June 2019.
- "Paradise Unbound", Analog, September/October 2019.

AI PI stories

- "A Case of Identity", Analog, December 2015.
- "The Satellites of Damocles", Future Science Fiction Digest, June 2019.
- "The Adventure of the Meat Interpreter", Grantville Gazette, January 2020.
- "The Final Problem", Grantville Gazette, March 2020.

Shoals of Space-Time stories

(Following are the original short-fiction and serial appearances; see above for subsequent novelization.)

- "On the Shoals of Space-Time", Grantville Gazette (Universe Annex), September 2020.
- "Marooned in Space-Time", Grantville Gazette (Universe Annex), November 2020.
- "Adrift in Space-Time", Grantville Gazette (Universe Annex), January 2021.
- "Ill-Met in Space-Time", Grantville Gazette (Universe Annex), May / July / September 2021.

=== Non-fiction ===
Books

- Trope-ing the Light Fantastic: The Science Behind the Fiction, 2018, ISBN 978-1612424019.

Articles

- "InterstellarNet". The Science Behind the Story. Analog Science Fiction and Fact. 2006. Archived from the original on July 8, 2012. (Note: Updated in 2010.)
- "Beyond this point be RFIDs". Analog Science Fiction and Fact. September 2007.
- "The Old Gray Goo, It Ain't What It Used To Be", The Bulletin of the Science Fiction and Fantasy Writers of America, Fall 2007.
- "Follow the Nanobrick Road". Analog Science Fiction and Fact. 128 (9): 38–48. September 2008.
- "Rock! Bye-Bye, Baby", Analog, November 2009.
- "Say, What? Ruminations about Language, Communications, and Science Fiction", Analog, March 2011.
- "Lost in Space? Follow the Money", Analog, October 2011.
- "Faster than a Speeding Photon", Analog, January/February 2012
- "Alien Aliens: Beyond Rubber Suits", Analog, April 2013.
- "Victory lapse". Guest Editorial. Analog Science Fiction and Fact. 133 (5): 4–7. May 2013.
- "Alien worlds: not in Kansas any more". Science Fact. Analog Science Fiction and Fact. 133 (10): 23–32. October 2013.
- "Hacked off". Guest Editorial. Analog Science Fiction and Fact. 133 (12): 4–7, 104. December 2013.
- "Alien dimensions : the universe next door". Science Fact. Analog Science Fiction and Fact. 134 (4): 24–30. April 2014.
- "Are we there yet?". Guest Editorial. Analog Science Fiction and Fact. 134 (5): 4–7. May 2014.
- "Alternate abilities : the paranormal". Science Fact. Analog Science Fiction and Fact. 134 (6): 19–28. June 2014.
- "Alien AWOLs : the great silence". Analog Science Fiction and Fact. October 2014.
- "Alien altercations : star (spanning) wars". Science Fact. Analog Science Fiction and Fact. 135 (7–8): 44–55. July–August 2015.
- "Alien adventures : rising to the challenge". Science Fact. Analog Science Fiction and Fact. 135 (10): 26–35. October 2015.
- "Human 2.0 : being all we can be, part I". Science Fact. Analog Science Fiction and Fact. 136 (1&2): 42–50. January–February 2016.
- "Human 2.0: Being All We Can Be (Part II)", Analog, March 2016.
- "A certain uncertainty". The Alternate View. Analog Science Fiction and Fact. 136 (4): 62–64. April 2016.
- "The dread question". Guest Editorial. Analog Science Fiction and Fact. 136 (5): 4–6. May 2016.
- "Here we go loopedy loop : a brief history of time travel (part I)". Science Fact. Analog Science Fiction and Fact. 136 (5): 34–43. May 2016.
- "Here we go loopedy loop : a brief history of time travel (part II)". Science Fact. Analog Science Fiction and Fact. 136 (6). June 2016.
- "A Mind of Its Own (Part I)", Analog, September 2016.
- "A Mind of Its Own (Part II)", Analog, October 2016.
- "Dystopic? Or myopic?". Guest Editorial. Analog Science Fiction and Fact. 138 (11–12): 4–7. November–December 2018.

———————

Bibliography notes
