= The Handicapped =

Science Fiction Short Story

First publication Cover art by Gray Morrow

"The Handicapped" is a science fiction short story by Larry Niven, originally published in the December 1967 issue of Galaxy Science Fiction as "Handicap". Set in the Known Space universe, the story introduces the Grogs, the sessile but sentient inhabitants of the planet Down.

== Plot ==
Mr Garvey arrives at the planet Down, having heard about the natives called Grogs. Garvey Limited, a company owned by his father, makes artificial limbs and other tools for the "Handicapped" species; sentient beings that evolved minds but with nothing that would serve as hands, like dolphins. A local reluctantly agrees to show him a living Grog in the desert, but the Grog turns out to be a disappointment. It is sessile enough, being a furry cone living anchored to a rock, but it seems utterly void of sentience. The latter observation is later confirmed by a local exobiologist.

The next morning, Garvey has a revelation. Somehow he knows the Grogs are sentient, without knowing why he knows. He returns to the desert and finds another Grog that begins to communicate with Garvey telepathically. It turns out the Grogs are indeed sentient beings with strong telepathic abilities, but for fear of being perceived as a threat for this very reason, they have concealed this until now. But having read Garvey's mind, and seeing that he can help them break their isolation, they are willing to take their chances. Garvey worries that the Grog telepathic power is very like those of the Thrintun (or Slavers).

He returns the next day with a typewriter that a Grog can use to communicate non-telepathically, as he does not like the "crystal certainties" placed into his mind. The Grog indicates that life as sessile creatures is very boring. They would like an animal with something like hands that they can control, plus access to human libraries and guest lecturers who would not object to having their minds read. They offer to use their powers to herd livestock, guard Down against invasion, perform police work, and monitor zoo animals. They deny any knowledge of the Slavers and claim that working together the Grogs cannot reach more than halfway across the planet with their minds, so they are no threat to humans.

Due to the public relations problems of the Grog power, a campaign is launched to show the Grogs as harmless and useful. But just in case, an old Bussard ramjet ship is placed in orbit that can be used to cause the local sun to emit deadly radiation. Garvey still worries that the Grogs might not be truthful regarding the range of their power and be able to defeat that fail-safe.
