= Tales of Known Space =

Book by Larry Niven

- First edition
- Author: Larry Niven
- Cover artist: Rick Sternbach
- Language: English
- Genre: Science fiction
- Publisher: Ballantine Books
- Publication date: August 1975
- Publication place: United States
- Media type: Print (paperback)
- Pages: 240
- ISBN: 0-345-24563-6

Tales of Known Space: The Universe of Larry Niven is a science fiction collection by American writer Larry Niven, collecting thirteen short stories published between 1964 and 1975 (all in Niven's Known Space future history) along with several essays by Niven and a chronology. This book was collected in Three Books of Known Space.

== Contents ==
- "Timeline for Known Space" (1975 essay, Larry Niven)
- "Introduction: My Universe and Welcome to It!" (1975 essay, Larry Niven)
- "The Coldest Place" (1964)
- "Becalmed in Hell" (1965)
- "Wait It Out" (1968)
- "Eye of an Octopus" (1966)
- "How the Heroes Die" (1966)
- "The Jigsaw Man" (1967)
- "At the Bottom of a Hole" (1966)
- "Intent to Deceive" (1968)
- "Cloak of Anarchy" (1972)
- "The Warriors" (1966)
- "The Borderland of Sol" (1975) (In the Three Books of Known Space omnibus, "Madness Has Its Place" replaced this story)
- "There Is a Tide" (1968)
- "Safe at Any Speed" (1967)
- "Afterthoughts" (1975 essay, Larry Niven)
- "Bibliography: The Worlds of Larry Niven"
- "About the Cover" (1975 essay, Rick Sternbach)

== Literary significance and reception ==
In John Clute's survey of Niven's work in The Encyclopedia of Science Fiction, he described the sequence as a "wide-ranging, complex, unusually well integrated Future History which, within an essentially optimistic and technophilic frame, provides an explanatory structure for the expansion of humanity into space, one notable from the first for the complexity of the Universe into which it introduces the burgeoning human race." Particular note is given to the inclusion of the timeline chart in Tales of Known Space.

In his essay on the theme of "Future Histories", Alastair Reynolds said that Known Space was the first of the kind he encountered as a teenager and remembered reading this collection (though he incorrectly gives the title as Tales from Known Space). Reynolds describes it as having "a sense of the future as teeming, chaotic, prone to unexpected swerves and lurching accelerations." His earliest attempts at SF (Union World, Dominant Species and a number of short stories) were set in a Niven-inspired background and, although they were not published, elements of them were incorporated into his later novels.
