= All the Myriad Ways =

1971 collection of short stories and essays by Larry Niven

- First edition
- Author: Larry Niven
- Cover artist: Dean Ellis
- Language: English
- Genre: Science fiction
- Publisher: Ballantine Books
- Publication date: 1971
- Publication place: United States
- Media type: Print (hardback & paperback)
- Pages: 181

All the Myriad Ways is a collection of 14 short science fiction stories and essays by American writer Larry Niven, originally published in 1971.

== Contents ==
- "All the Myriad Ways"
- "Passerby"
- "For a Foggy Night"
- "Wait it Out"
- "The Jigsaw Man"
- "Not Long Before the End"
- "Unfinished Story #1"
- "Unfinished Story #2"
- "Man of Steel, Woman of Kleenex"
- "Exercise in Speculation: The Theory and Practice of Teleportation"
- "The Theory and Practice of Time Travel"
- "Inconstant Moon" (Made into an Outer Limits episode)
- "What Can You Say About Chocolate Covered Manhole Covers?"
- "Becalmed in Hell"

== Overview ==
The title story can be read as a response to stories featuring the many-worlds interpretation as a key plot point, by taking the social implications of infinite realities to a depressing conclusion. A police detective, pondering a rash of unexplained suicides and murder-suicides occurring since the discovery of travel to parallel universes, begins to realize that if all possible choices that might be made actually are made in parallel universes, people will see their freedom of choice as meaningless. The choice not to commit suicide, or not to commit a crime, seems meaningless if one knows that in some other universe, the choice went the other way. They therefore kill themselves or commit the crime, because they abandon the sense of choice. The story ends with a quick sequence of vignettes of actions that the detective takes in nearby parallel universes.

The oft-discussed essay "Man of Steel, Woman of Kleenex" is a humorous discussion of the difficulties Superman might encounter in trying to conceive a child with Lois Lane.

In "Passerby", a space traveler in a crippled ship is rescued by a technologically advanced alien. He faints when he sees a child rescue a caterpillar from a busy sidewalk.

In "For a Foggy Night", another many-worlds story, a math professor crosses the street from his hotel through a dense fog to go to a bar. There he has a conversation with a stranger who tells him that the fog results from the collision of many universes and the probability that something like the fuzzy objects exist in a preponderance of the colliding universes. When the fog clears, the professor's hotel is no longer there. He waits for more fog and wanders into it, hoping to get home. This time when the fog clears, he is seized by silent men in white coats. They take him to an asylum which turns out to be a rehab clinic for people who can't read minds. He "recovers" quickly, since he has no brain damage. He goes on to make a comfortable living "inventing" technologies he remembers from his home universe. And now when it gets foggy, he stays put.

In "Wait It Out", an astronaut marooned on Pluto exposes himself to the planet's extreme cold, intending to go into frozen sleep until rescue eventually comes, but finds his brain still functioning due to superconductivity.

In "Not Long Before the End", magic is real but is an exhaustible resource. An extremely old wizard who would otherwise long since have died of old age maintains his middle-aged condition by magic. When confronted by a dull warrior who is possessed by a demon, the wizard works a spell to destroy the demon by exhausting all the nearby magic. He then easily dispatches the warrior with a non-magical weapon, and his girlfriend carries him out of the magic-exhausted zone before he can die of old age. For now, he's saved. But he reflects that someday all the magic everywhere will be gone, and then the stupid warriors will win all the fights.

In "Unfinished Story #1", a wizard describes a temperature-control spell that works by having a dull-witted demon select the kinetic energy of air molecules entering and leaving the room. His listener compliments him on the cleverness of the spell. But the wizard says that his clerk invented the spell, and calls him into the room: "Oh, Maxwell..."

"Unfinished Story #2" is a one-liner.

And "What Can You Say About Chocolate-Covered Manhole Covers" explains all of the creation myths as a breeding experiment by aliens.
