= Protector (novel) =

1973 science fiction novel by Larry Niven

- Paperback first edition
- Author: Larry Niven
- Cover artist: Dean Ellis
- Language: English
- Genre: Science fiction
- Publisher: Ballantine Books
- Publication date: 1973
- Publication place: United States
- Media type: Print (hardback & paperback)
- ISBN: 0-345-23486-3

Protector is a 1973 science fiction novel by American writer Larry Niven, set in his Known Space universe. It was nominated for the Hugo in 1974, and placed fourth in the annual Locus poll for that year.

The work fleshes out a species called the Pak, originally introduced in a 1967 story called “The Adults,” which forms the first half of the novel (there titled Phssthpok); the second half is titled Vandervecken. The character Tim Truesdale was replaced by Tina Jordan, and some passages were rearranged. The Pak also appear in several of Niven's later works, including the later volumes of the Ringworld series and the novel Destroyer of Worlds which serves as a semi-sequel to Protector.

== Plot summary ==
The novel comprises two phases in the same space that are separated by 220 years of time. Its central conceit is that Humans evolved from the juvenile stage of the Pak, a species with a distinct adult form ("Protectors") that has immense strength and intelligence and cares only about younger Pak of their bloodline. A key plot point is that transition to the Protector stage is mediated by consumption of the root of a particular plant called Tree-of-Life, which cannot be effectively cultivated on Earth.

The first half of the book follows the path of a Pak named Phssthpok, who has travelled from the Pak homeworld in search of a colony of Pak in the distant system of Sol (the Solar System). Upon his arrival, he captures a Belter (a worker from the asteroid belt) named Jack Brennan, who is infected by Phssthpok's store of tree-of-life root and is transformed into a Protector (or at least a Human variant). They land on Mars where Brennan kills Phssthpok and is rescued by two Humans, Nick Sohl and Lucas Garner, who had set out to meet the alien. The first half of the novel ends with Brennan telling his story to the Humans before he heads for the outer reaches of the Solar System.

The second half of the book follows the path of a Human named Roy Truesdale who has been abducted with no memory of the event. While searching for his abductor, he befriends a Belter named Alice Jordan who helps him figure out that the man he has sought is none other than Jack Brennan. Truesdale and Jordan find Brennan in the outer solar system on a fabricated world of Brennan's design called Kobold. Brennan discovers that a Pak invasion fleet is headed towards human space and takes Truesdale to a Human outpost colony called Home in an effort to divert attention away from Earth. During their journey they battle with scout ships from the Pak fleet. Brennan and Truesdale arrive at Home only to have Truesdale realize that Brennan plans to convert the colony into a defensive Human Protector army. Truesdale kills Brennan and lands on Home, but is himself infected with a mutated strain of the Tree-of-Life virus that quickly spreads to a number of other colonists, thus carrying out Brennan's plan despite Truesdale's initial attempts to thwart it. Upon his conversion to Protector form, Truesdale immediately comes to view Brennan's plan as necessary and completes it by breaking out of hospital confinement and infecting the entire population of Home. The modified virus either kills or converts the remaining inhabitants, resulting in an army of childless Protectors. The new Protectors think that they absolutely must act quickly to save the rest of Humanity, and start preparing for battle with the Pak invasion fleet.

As an aside, it is mentioned that during his sojourn in the outer Solar System Brennan had engineered a genocide on Mars, sending a large ice asteroid to crash into the planet in order to raise the water content of its atmosphere. Water is lethal to the Martians' metabolism, thus this effectively wiped out the species. This incident serves to underscore the Pak Protectors' inherent xenophobia and utter ruthlessness in pursuing their ultimate goal of protecting their descendants.

The events which impelled Brennan to this action are those narrated in "How the Heroes Die" and "At the Bottom of a Hole", two short 1966 stories which Niven originally published in Galaxy Science Fiction and later collected in Inconstant Moon. As depicted in these stories, there were two incidents in which Martians killed some humans who landed on their world, after which humans just left Mars alone. In the mind of the Protector Brennan – committed to defending humans and having no consideration whatever for others – that was sufficient reason to exterminate the entire species.

== Concepts ==
=== Pak ===
A species called Pak lives on a planet near the Milky Way core. The species has three main stages of development: Child, Breeder, Protector. A Pak is born, and matures into a Breeder, at which point he or she may bear children. Breeders are not particularly intelligent. Around 34 Pak years of age (c.42 Earth years), the root of the Tree-of-Life plant begins to smell delicious to all Breeders, and they eat it and metamorphose into the Protector stage via a virus that lives in the plant. A Protector's joints expand to give its muscles a greater moment arc, its skin wrinkles into a tough armor, and fingernails turn into retractable claws. A second heart develops near the groin, the mouth fuses into a beak, and all sexual characteristics disappear. The most important change is that the brain expands, giving a Protector a tremendous intellect. A Protector has no motivation other than the preservation of its bloodline, and to that end the Pak homeworld is never free from war, since all Protectors are constantly trying to ensure their progeny's survival at the expense of everyone else. If a Protector has no children left, it no longer feels the urge to eat and dies unless it can alter its outlook to adopt the entire Pak race and work towards their benefit.

=== Origin of humanity ===
Two and a half million years ago, a group of Protectors hollowed out an asteroid, turned it into a ship, and set sail for the galactic arms. They eventually settled on Earth, but discovered that the Tree-of-Life root would not grow, meaning that no Breeders would turn into Protectors, and the Protectors would die without the root. The Protectors spent their time building a laser strong enough to send a message for help back to the Pak homeworld. Eventually, the Breeders, known to us as Homo habilis, evolved into present-day forms, including humans.

=== Phssthpok ===
Phssthpok had lost all of his fertile descendants in a war on the Pak homeworld, and needed to find meaning for his life, or he would die. After spending much time in the homeworld's library, he found the story of the Pak expedition to find a habitable planet in the galactic arms. He worked out that the soil of Earth lacked adequate thallium oxide, and mounted a rescue mission aboard a ramship 33,000 years ago, arriving in the Solar System in 2125 AD.

=== Persephone ===
According to the novel, Persephone is the tenth planet (a Planet X) of the Solar System. While actually proposed in the 1970s to account for perturbations for the orbit of Neptune, Niven gives it additional qualities such as retrograde motion, an orbit tilted 61 degrees to the ecliptic, and a mass slightly less than that of Saturn.

=== Neutronium ===
Brennan created an 8 ft diameter sphere of neutronium, a material consisting of densely packed neutrons. The sphere had a surface gravity of eight million g and was maintained within a stasis field at his world of Kobold.

=== Kobold ===
Kobold is the man-made world that Jack Brennan created out at the edge of the Solar System from raw material using his advanced intelligence as a Protector and his human sense of whimsy, complete with an artificial ecosystem. Kobold was Brennan's home for over 200 years. It was destroyed at the departure of Brennan and Roy Truesdale from Kobold. Kobold would appear to be named after the Kobolds of German folklore, spirits that people believed to be mischievous tricksters at times, and at other times prayed to for protection. This role fits Jack Brennan's dual nature as a trickster (using his superior intellect to baffle humans on Earth) and as a self-appointed Protector of Humanity.

== Timeline of events ==
- 2.5 m.y.a. — Settlement of Earth by Pak colonists.
- 33,000 BC — Phssthpok departs Pak homeworld.
- 32,800 BC — First emigration wave departs Pak homeworld.
- 32,500 BC — Second emigration wave departs Pak homeworld.
- 32,500- BC — Pak scouts depart Pak homeworld.
- 2125 AD — Phssthpok arrives at Sol. Brennan turns protector.
- 2340 AD — Kidnap of Truesdale.
- 2341 AD — Discovery of Pak fleet. Departure of Flying Dutchman. Destruction of Kobold.
- 2346 AD — Discovery of Phssthpok's Star.
- 2350 AD — Arrival at Home.

== Reception ==
Sidney Coleman reviewed the novel favorably in F&SF; although describing it as really "two long novelettes passing as a novel," he noted that "both halves of the book are permeated with the ingenuity that has been the driving energy of Niven's stories since his earliest work."
