= The Ringworld Throne =

1996 novel by Larry Niven

- Ballantine front cover
- Author: Larry Niven
- Cover artist: Barclay Shaw
- Language: English
- Series: Ringworld, Known Space
- Genre: Science fiction
- Publisher: Del Rey
- Publication date: 1996
- Publication place: United States
- Media type: Print (hardback & paperback)
- Pages: 424
- ISBN: 0-345-35861-9
- OCLC: 33818303
- Dewey Decimal: 813/.54 20
- LC Class: PS3564.I9 R56 1996
- Preceded by: The Ringworld Engineers
- Followed by: Ringworld's Children

The Ringworld Throne is a science fiction novel by American writer Larry Niven, first published in 1996. It is the direct sequel to his previous work The Ringworld Engineers (1980). He wrote it as a replacement after being unable to finish his contracted novel The Ghost Ships, the sequel to The Integral Trees and The Smoke Ring.

== Plot summary ==
This book consists of two main plot threads, which only come together towards the end of the book.

A variety of Ringworld hominid species, led by the Machine woman Valavirgillin (from The Ringworld Engineers), join together to kill a large nest of vampires (the shadow nest) which has been feeding on all of them. With the help of two Ghouls, who know that the nest is located under an abandoned floating factory, they manage to cast out the vampires. The Ghouls find one of the Hindmost's spying devices in the factory and transport it all the way to the rim, to ask for help against the Protectors who rule the rim.

Meanwhile, Louis Wu decides to die of old age instead of asking the Hindmost for rejuvenation, as self-punishment for his helping the Hindmost to restabilize the Ringworld at the end of The Ringworld Engineers, killing (as he thinks) a trillion hominids to save the rest. After ten years of wandering around the Ringworld and aging, the Hindmost convinces him that he killed far fewer people than expected. Since there are signs of several Protectors on the Ringworld, Louis returns to the Hindmost to be restored to health in exchange for service, only for the pair of them (along with a Kzin named Acolyte, son of Chmeee) to be enslaved by a vampire Protector ("Bram"). Bram shoots down ARM and Patriarchy ships attacking the Ringworld, and then tries to overthrow the other vampire Protectors who control the rim wall. He manages to kill them all, but returns wounded to the control center, where he fights and is killed by a Ghoul protector Louis has created.
