= Ringworld's Children =

2004 novel by Larry Niven

- First edition
- Author: Larry Niven
- Language: English
- Series: Ringworld
- Genre: Science fiction
- Publisher: Tor Books
- Publication date: 2004
- Publication place: United States
- Media type: Print (hardback & paperback)
- Pages: 288
- ISBN: 0-7653-0167-9
- OCLC: 53887611
- Dewey Decimal: 813/.54 22
- LC Class: PS3564.I9 R57 2004
- Preceded by: The Ringworld Throne
- Followed by: Fate of Worlds

Ringworld's Children is a 2004 science fiction novel by American writer Larry Niven, the fourth in the Ringworld series set in the Known Space universe. It describes the continuing adventures of Louis Wu and companions on Ringworld.

== Plot summary ==
The novel's plot is largely concerned with the so-called Fringe War. All the intelligent species of Known Space are interested in the Ringworld. In the novel, they engage in a Cold War of sorts (actually begun in the previous novel, The Ringworld Throne) on the fringe of the Ringworld star system.
