= Fleet of Worlds =

2007 science fiction novel by Niven & Lerner

- First edition
- Author: Larry Niven and Edward M. Lerner
- Cover artist: Stephan Martinière
- Language: English
- Series: Known Space
- Genre: Science fiction
- Publisher: Tor Books
- Publication date: October 16, 2007
- Publication place: United States
- Media type: Hardcover
- Pages: 304
- ISBN: 0-7653-1825-3
- OCLC: 123767292
- Dewey Decimal: 813/.54 22
- LC Class: PS3564.I9 F57 2007
- Preceded by: "At the Core"
- Followed by: Juggler of Worlds

Fleet of Worlds
- Known Space location
- Created by: Larry Niven
- Genre: Science fiction

In-universe information
- Type: Planet
- Race: Pierson's Puppeteers
- Characters: Nessus, Hindmost, Chiron

Fleet of Worlds is a science fiction novel by American writers Larry Niven and Edward M. Lerner, part of Niven's Known Space series. Fleet of Worlds can also refer to the series consisting of this book and its four sequels.

== Novel ==
The novel, co-written by Niven and Edward M. Lerner, was released in 2007 and nominated for a Prometheus Award. It is set shortly after the events of the short story "At the Core". The novel concerns the liberation of New Terra from the Concordance of the Pierson's Puppeteers. It also introduces a new intelligent species to Known Space, the Gw'oth.

== Series ==
The Fleet of Worlds series consists of five books by the same authors:

- Fleet of Worlds (2007)
- Juggler of Worlds (2008)
- Destroyer of Worlds (2009)
- Betrayer of Worlds (2010)
- Fate of Worlds: Return from the Ringworld (2012)

The first four novels are prequels to Ringworld. The last one is a sequel.
