= Flatlander (short story collection) =

1995 collection of stories by Larry Niven

- First edition, published by Del Rey Books. Cover art by Chris Moore.
- Author: Larry Niven
- Language: English
- Publication date: 1995

Flatlander (ISBN 0-345-39480-1) is a 1995 collection of stories by American writer Larry Niven, all set in Known Space. It is the definitive collection of all stories by Niven about ARM agent Gil Hamilton. Many of the stories revolve around the theme of involuntary organ transplantation.

The book includes the stories "Death by Ecstasy" (formerly "The Organleggers"), "The Defenseless Dead", "ARM", "The Patchwork Girl", and "The Woman in Del Rey Crater"—the only previously unpublished story in the collection.

The collection is essentially a replacement for a 1976 collection called The Long ARM of Gil Hamilton (ISBN 0-345-24868-6) which contained only the first three stories. "The Patchwork Girl" was also published alone as a novel in 1986 (ISBN 0-441-65315-4).

The title derives from the in-universe term flatlander, referring to an Earth-living human, as opposed to those who do not live on planets. This is because the land looks 'flat'.

== See also ==
- "Flatlander" - an unrelated Known Space short story, also by Larry Niven
