= The Borderland of Sol =

1975 science fiction novelette by Larry Niven

- Short story by Larry Niven
- "The Borderland of Sol", with a cover by John Schoenherr

Publication
- Published in: Analog
- Publication date: January 1975

"The Borderland of Sol" is a science fiction novelette by American writer Larry Niven. It is the fifth in the Known Space series of stories about crashlander Beowulf Shaeffer.

The story was originally published in Analog, January 1975, printed in the collection Tales of Known Space, Niven, Del Ray, reissued 1985 (ISBN 978-0-345-33469-5), and reprinted in Crashlander, Larry Niven, New York: Ballantine, 1994, pp. 160–207 (ISBN 978-0-345-38168-2). The story won the Hugo Award for Best Novelette in 1976 and was nominated for the Locus Poll Award for Best Novelette in 1976.

It is one of the earliest works of fiction to feature a black hole.

Segments of the novel Fleet of Worlds serve as a prequel to the story.

== Plot summary ==
A rash of spaceship disappearances around Earth results in a dearth of available transit, stranding Beowulf "Bey" Shaeffer on Jinx away from his love, Sharrol Janss. While visiting the Institute of Knowledge he runs into his old friend Carlos Wu. Carlos is the father of Janss' two children, a fact that he found so embarrassing that he decided to leave Earth rather than face Bey upon his expected return. But Bey proves perfectly happy to hear about the children, as his albinism denies him a license to have children of his own, and he and Sharrol had agreed that Carlos should act as a surrogate.

Reconciled, Carlos mentions that he has been contacted by Sigmund Ausfaller of the Bureau of Alien Affairs, who has offered him a ride to Earth. Bey has had several run-ins with Ausfaller in the past; Ausfaller aims to protect human-alien relations in any way he can, and at one point he planted a bomb on Bey's alien-provided General Products' #2 hull to prevent him from stealing it and potentially causing a sticky diplomatic incident. Worried about what might happen to Carlos at Ausfaller's hands, he decides to accompany him on his next meeting.

Bey, Carlos and Ausfaller meet. Ausfaller explains that alien passengers were aboard some of the vessels that disappeared, and he has been given the job of finding out what is going on to avoid further issues. His ship, the Hobo Kelly, appears to be a cargo and passenger ship, but in reality is a warship built out of a nearly invulnerable General Products' #2 hull, capable of 30G of acceleration, armed with guided missiles, an x-ray laser and smaller laser cannons. Additionally, of the eight ships that have disappeared to date, only two were incoming, the other six were outgoing; their inbound mission has the odds in its favor.

This proves to be the case for most of the journey, but only moments before entering the outskirts of Sol the ship suddenly lurches and drops out of hyperspace. Examining the area they discover three small tugs at some distance, but nothing else of interest. They turn towards Sol and continue on their way home while Bey checks the ship to try to find out what happened. He discovers that the hyperdrive motor is completely missing from the hull. When he informs the crew, Carlos uses the ship's hyperwave communications to retrieve information from Elephant's databanks on Earth, looking up a number of black hole related topics.

When his inquiries are finally answered, he finds that one of the bits of information was written by Dr. Julian Forward, a researcher Carlos has wanted to meet. Carlos calls him and they discuss the disappearing hyperdrive motor. Forward invites them to Forward Station to wait for a ferry to Earth. They agree to his plans, although Forward Station is right where the ships are disappearing. Ausfaller agrees that Carlos and Bey can go to Forward Station; he did not reveal himself during the conversation and the small ship would not give away the fact that there was a third crewmember.

After equipping for potential combat, Bey and Carlos ferry to the station to meet with Forward. He shows them his prize possession, the "Grabber", an electromagnetic assembly that lets him shake masses of neutronium to produce polarized gravitational waves, which he is attempting to use to establish communications with alien races who may not have discovered hyperwave. When Forward asks Carlos what he thinks has happened, Carlos explains that a black hole might have been able to do it –gravity is one of the few forces that can penetrate a General Products starship hull. When Carlos admits that he has heard of quantum black holes, Forward takes them both captive.

Forward explains that he found the Tunguska meteorite, which was actually a small black hole. Returning it to the station he fed it the sphere of neutronium he was previously using for his communications attempt, thereby increasing its mass, and then fed in the exhaust of an ion engine to give it a permanent electric charge. The hole could now be manipulated with magnets, and towed around by the tugs. The tugs move it into the path of incoming starships to disable them, and then pirate the now-defenseless ships.

When the tugs return to the station, Forward suddenly asks if someone else is aboard the Hobo Kelly, a question that is answered when Ausfaller fires on the tugs, destroying two and causing the third to flee. The tugs drop the black hole, but Forward and his assistant Angel manage to catch it in the Grabber. However, by this time Bey has managed to free himself enough to cut through his bonds, which turn out to be the power cable feeding the Grabber, releasing the black hole once again. As the hole falls towards the station it hits the dome and cuts a hole in it, sucking Forward's assistant into it. Forward makes some adjustments on his control panel and is then sucked into the hole as well.

Ausfaller rescues Bey and Carlos, who explain what was happening. They speculate that Forward deliberately turned up the air pressure in his final moments in order to allow the two to live until Ausfaller returned. They watch as the quantum black hole collapses the asteroid and it disappears in a searing blast of light.

== See also ==
- Neutron Star, the first story in the Beowulf Shaeffer series.
- At the Core, the second story in the series.
- Flatlander, the third story in the series.
- Grendel, the fourth story in the series.
- Procrustes, the sixth story in the series.
- Ghost, the framing story in the collection Crashlander.
- Fly-By-Night, the seventh story in the series, written after Crashlander.
