= Grendel (short story) =

1968 science fiction short story by Larry Niven

"Grendel" is an English language science fiction short story written in 1968 by Larry Niven. It is the fourth in the series of Known Space stories featuring crashlander Beowulf Shaeffer. The short story was originally published in Neutron Star (1968), and reprinted in Crashlander (1994). It has no connection to the creatures called Grendels in Niven's Heorot series.

== Synopsis ==
Beowulf "Bey" Shaeffer is on a flight between Down and Gummidgy when the ship's captain, Margo Tellefsen, announces that she is dropping out of hyperdrive so passengers can witness a starseed setting sail. Just after this happens, all passengers are knocked out by a gas introduced in the ship's life system; while no cargo is missing, a Kdatlyno touch sculptor named Lloobee has vanished.

Soon enough, the kidnappers make contact with the local government and demand ten million "stars" (the interstellar form of currency) for Lloobee's safe return. Because Kdatlyno cannot spend extended time in small space ships (Margo mentioned seeing a large yacht before passing out), Shaeffer reasons that Lloobee's kidnappers must have taken him onto the planet. After looking through spaceport records, Shaeffer and fellow passenger Emil Horne reason that the most likely ship to have carried Lloobee was Drunkard's Walk, a ship owned by Larchmont Bellamy, an acquaintance of Shaeffer's.

At Emil's insistence, the two briefly visit Bellamy's hunting camp. After dinner, Emil and Shaeffer say their goodbyes and leave. However, after flying over the horizon, Shaeffer drops the ship almost to ground level and subsonic speed, turning back to the camp. He reasons that not only are Bellamy and crew the kidnappers, but that Margo must have helped them. On foot, they find the cave where Lloobee is being held but, before Shaeffer can explain that the Gummidgy MP's can take care of the matter from this point, Emil charges into the cave, revealing their position. Both are rendered unconscious and captured.

When he awakens, Bellamy and his co-kidnappers openly discuss what to do about Shaeffer and his friend, thinking that he is still unconscious. They plan on faking their death by a carnivore. Lloobee suddenly leaps at one of the kidnappers, allowing Shaeffer a window to jump up and race out of the cave. He makes his way to the car, where he finds Bellamy waiting for him to appear. Because the goggles worn by everyone form a black protective dot over the sun, Shaeffer approaches the car with the sun at his back to cover his approach; he charges and the two fight hand-to-hand until Shaeffer runs into the car and takes off.

Bellamy then comes after Shaeffer in Drunkard's Walk and attempts to force Shaeffer into landing by repeatedly slamming the car with sonic booms. Shaeffer flies his car into the flank of the larger ship. The resulting crash breaks the bones in his hands and damages his car enough to force it down, while Bellamy lands his still-functional yacht in order to finish off Shaeffer. However, Shaeffer notices that the impact has damaged the yacht's landing gear and it is being held upright only by its gyroscopes. Bellamy rushes back aboard to try to deal with this, but the gyros overload and seize up while he is still on the boarding ladder, causing the yacht to spin end-for-end and bounce off into the distance. Bellamy is thrown high into the air and to his death.

Later, Shaeffer reveals to Margo that he knows of her involvement. She reveals in her turn that she is much older than she appears, and was Bellamy's mother; but she does not resent Shaeffer's part in his death, since she understood that he would certainly have run one deadly risk after another until he was inevitably killed. Instead, she asks him to stay with her until his lover on Earth, Sharrol, ends her two-year marriage contract with a local genius. Shaeffer agrees.

== See also ==
- "Neutron Star", the first story in the Beowulf Shaeffer series
- "At the Core", the second story in the series
- "Flatlander", the third story in the series
- "The Borderland of Sol", the fifth story in the series
- "Procrustes", the sixth story in the series
- "Ghost", the framing story in the collection Crashlander
- "Fly By Night", the seventh story in the series, written after Crashlander
