= At the Core =

1966 science fiction short story by Larry Niven

- Short story by Larry Niven
- Genre: Science fiction

Publication
- Published in: Worlds of If
- Publication date: November 1966

"At the Core" is an English-language science fiction short story by American writer Larry Niven, published in 1966. It is the second in the series of Known Space stories featuring crashlander Beowulf Shaeffer. The short story was originally published in Worlds of If, November 1966, and reprinted in Neutron Star (1968) and Crashlander (1994).

The novel Fleet of Worlds is set in the aftermath of the story, from the Puppeteer point of view. The story is retold, from the point of view of Sigmund Ausfaller, in Juggler of Worlds. The events are also referred to in Ringworld.

== Plot summary ==
Four years after the events in the other short story "Neutron Star", spaceship pilot Beowulf Shaeffer is on Jinx, a planet orbiting Sirius B, when he is again contacted by the Puppeteers, this time by the Regional President of General Products on Jinx, who offers him a chance to guide a cramped (but very fast) experimental ship to the center of the galaxy as a promotional stunt. Shaeffer is offered one hundred thousand stars to make the trip, plus fifty thousand stars to write about it; he is also given the rights to sell the story. Shaeffer, seeing the value of such a promotion (as well as the value of his pay) agrees to go, naming the ship Long Shot.

The Long Shot is built into the hull of a Number 4 General Products hull, a transparent sphere a thousand-odd feet in diameter. However, the Quantum II hyperdrive took up all of the volume of the ship, leaving only a few cubic yards of space for crew, cargo, or passengers. The cost, according to the Regional President of General Products on Jinx, was 7 billion stars. As it stood, the ship was a failure, unless the promotional run to the core and subsequent publicity generated the necessary interest for research funds.

The actual trip becomes more problematic. Shaeffer quickly realizes that he must maintain a constant watch over the mass pointer, the device that warns of a too-close approach to a star while in hyperdrive. At Quantum I hyperdrive speeds, Shaeffer only glanced at the pointer every six hours or so. At Quantum II speeds, however, he dared not take his eyes off the pointer. After three hours Shaeffer is exhausted and drops out of hyperspace, and attempts to abort the mission, but the Puppeteer reminds him that if he stops for other than mechanical failure, he forfeits twice his pay. As there are cameras watching him, he cannot sabotage the ship without the Puppeteer knowing he has done so. Shaeffer surmises that this is payback for the million stars he blackmailed out of the Puppeteers in Neutron Star.

By the second day Shaeffer realizes he cannot make the trip in the four month time limit, and will be forced to pay two thousand stars for each day he exceeds that limit. He estimates it will take him six months to complete the trip, forfeiting about 120,000 stars and leaving him in about the same state of near insolvency he is in now. However, he suddenly realizes that if he can make some of the trip to the core between spiral arms of the galaxy where the stars are far apart, he will not have to dodge stars quite as frequently. He requests this information and one of the Puppeteer’s assistants provides him with a course to exit the spiral arm. In three weeks’ time he travels to the end of the gap and begins to enter the central portion of the galaxy.

Within three days he breaks through the obscuring interstellar dust and gas and sees the Core. As he continues toward the Core he encounters more problems: brightness and radiation, both of which continue to climb as he approaches closer and closer to the Core itself. He attempts to talk to the puppeteer about this but the puppeteer is uninterested in abstract knowledge that does not directly contribute to Puppeteer profits or survival.

Finally, Shaeffer halts, unwilling to go on. He contacts the Puppeteer via hyperphone and tells him that the galaxy is exploding: the Core stars have gone supernova and are causing other stars to do the same as the impinging radiation heats them up. The Puppeteer asks if Shaeffer wishes to be released from his contract without pay and Shaeffer declines, amused. The Puppeteer explains that if Shaeffer does not enter the Core, he forfeits on the contract. Shaeffer explains that he will show the radiation readings and brightness levels, and if questioned under truth drugs, any court in Known Space would know the Puppeteers tried to get Shaeffer to fly into the center of the holocaust, and it would rule against the Puppeteers. The Puppeteer concedes, and tells Shaeffer to return home.

Returning to Farside End on Jinx, feeling persecuted since his hyperphone calls have gone unanswered during his return trip, Shaeffer discovers the following: First, General Products has paid 150,000 stars into his account at the Bank of Jinx, with a note that whether he wrote an article about his trip was solely up to him. Second, the General Products corporation has disappeared, paying off all penalty clauses on all known worlds two months before. Third, a stock market crash is imminent, resulting from the disappearance of General Products and the lack of starship hulls. Fourth, the secret of the General Products hull is up for sale; bids are being taken by human representatives for one year, the minimum bid, one trillion stars. Fifth and finally, no one knows why any of this is taking place.

Shaeffer, however, knows. The Puppeteers are running, escaping the deadly radiation that will reach Known Space in 20,000 years. Puppeteers are considered cowards by other races, but Shaeffer wonders about the humans who are ignoring the threat simply because it's so far off. "Maybe," he thinks, "it's humans who are the cowards, at the core."

== See also ==
- "Neutron Star", the first story in the Beowulf Shaeffer series.
- "Flatlander", the third story in the series.
- "Grendel", the fourth story in the series.
- "The Borderland of Sol", the fifth story in the series.
- "Procrustes", the sixth story in the series.
- "Ghost", the framing story in the collection Crashlander.
