= Inconstant Star =

1991 novel by Poul Anderson

- Cover of first edition
- Author: Poul Anderson
- Cover artist: Larry Elmore
- Language: English
- Series: Man-Kzin Wars
- Genre: Science fiction
- Publisher: Baen Books
- Publication date: 1 January 1991 (1st edition)
- Publication place: United States
- Media type: Print (Paperback)
- Pages: 314 (paperback edition - 1st edition)
- ISBN: 0-671-72031-7 (paperback edition - 1st edition)
- OCLC: 22922760
- LC Class: CPB Box no. 2654 vol. 8

Inconstant Star is a science fiction fix-up novel by American writer Poul Anderson. It is formed by the novellas Iron and Inconstant Star, first published in The Man-Kzin Wars (1988) and Man-Kzin Wars III (1990), respectively. The title is from the tumbling alien artifact that sends out radiation. Due to the tumbling effect, the output can only be seen briefly from a given point in space, looking like a star, but then disappearing as the artifact moves.

The title also references another Niven story, "Inconstant Moon", which is not part of the Known Space series. The novel is the story of Robert Saxtorph and his ship Rover, hired for peaceful missions, but which run into Kzinti at every turn.

== Plot summary ==
There are two parts to the novel, Iron, and Inconstant Star.

In “Iron”, Saxtorph and the Rover, hired by the wealthy Crashlander Laurinda Brozik, set out to explore a newly discovered red dwarf star. When they arrive, they are challenged by a Kzinti warship. Separating the crew onto the shuttles, the Rover is captured and landed on one of the moons. The first shuttle sets on Prima, the first planet, and is held fast by a planet-sized organism that begins dissolving the shuttle. They broadcast for rescue, and are refused help by the Kzin.

Meanwhile, helpless to rescue their friends, Robert, Dorcas, and Laurinda make a plan to steal a tug and escape back to friendly space with the news of the Kzin base. Dorcas pilots the tug, and takes out the ship guarding the Rover. Robert and Laurinda land, fight off a Kzinti shuttle, and recover the Rover. They are able to rescue Juan and Carita, and destroy the base with a guided asteroid.

In “Inconstant Star”, Saxtorph and crew are hired by Tyra Nordbo to redeem her father's honor, as he was accused of collaboration with the Kzin during their occupation of Wunderland. To do so, they must use notes he had left behind and follow a ship that had left 30 years prior to investigate a concentration of gamma rays. They travel to the coordinates, and find a massive artifact made of an unknown metal. A hole in the spherical artifact is pouring out lethal radiation. As they study it, they learn it is a weapon of the Tnuctip. It is a shell around a “captured” black hole, one that had been holed by a meteorite and is thus releasing the Hawking radiation. They then deduce the route of the original Kzin ship, and head off to the Father Sun, the star of the Kzin homeworld. En route, they locate the Sherrek, where Tyra's father Peter had worked free of his Kzin captors. They rescue him and head back to the artifact. Another Kzin ship, Swordbeak, also finds the old ship. They, too, head to the artifact, and catch the Rover by surprise. Just when all looks lost, Robert and Dorcas conceive a plan to use the artifact's radiation against the Kzin warship. In a last act of defiance, a dying Weoch-Captain activates the artifact's hyperdrive and heads out into unknown space.

== Characters ==
- Robert Saxtorph – Terran. Captain of the Rover. Husband of Dorcas.
- Dorcas Saxtorph – Terran. First Mate of the Rover. Wife of Robert.
- Kamehameha Ryan – Terran (Hawaiian). Crewman on the Rover and longtime friend of the Saxtorphs’.
- Carita Fenger – Crewman on the Rover. Jinxian.
- Juan Yoshii – Crewman on the Rover and aspiring poet. Belter.
- Laurinda Broznik – Astronomer who discovered the star in "Iron". Crashlander.
- Arthur Treginnis – Scientist. Mountaineer of Crew descent (who was a Colonist sympathizer during the revolution).
- Ulf Markham – Commissioner of the Interworld Space Commission and spy for the Kzinti. Wunderlander.
- Tyra Nordbo – Hires the Rover in "Inconstant Star". Daughter of Peter Nordbo.
- Peter Nordbo – Former landholder on Wunderland, amateur astronomer, and slave of the Kzin.
- Weoch-Captain – Kzin captain of the Swordbeak.

== See also ==
- Man-Kzin Wars
