= List of Known Space characters =

This is a list of fictional characters featured in the Known Space novels by Larry Niven.

== Individual characters ==
=== Sigmund Ausfaller ===
Sigmund Ausfaller, a native of Earth, is a member of the Amalgamated Regional Militia ("ARM"), working in the Bureau of Alien Affairs on Earth. To protect puppeteer (and Earth) interests, in "Neutron Star" Ausfaller plants a bomb in the lifesystem of Beowulf Shaeffer's ship, the Skydiver, so that Shaeffer will not attempt to steal it. Years later, in The Borderlands of Sol, when Shaeffer encounters him on Jinx, he offers Shaeffer and Carlos Wu a ride home to Earth on his ship, Hobo Kelly, in hopes of attracting the attention of whoever or whatever was causing ships to disappear when entering or leaving Sol system. Some years later, Ausfaller, having almost caught up with Shaeffer on Fafnir, is killed by Ander Smittarasheed in order to protect Smittarasheed's interest in the special nanotechnology autodoc developed by Carlos Wu, left on Fafnir when Carlos escaped from Feather Filip as she shot Shaeffer in the chest with an ARM punchgun. He is later "resurrected" by Wu's Autodoc and taken to one of the Puppeteer farming worlds by Nessus.

Ausfaller appears in the Beowulf Shaeffer stories "Neutron Star", The Borderland of Sol, and "Ghost", and is mentioned in the story "Procrustes". He also appears in the non-Shaeffer novel Fleet of Worlds and is the main human character in its sequels Juggler of Worlds and Destroyer of Worlds.

=== Larchmont Bellamy ===
Larchmont "Larch" Bellamy, a native of Earth, is a wealthy human who owns the ship Drunkard’s Walk. A lean man with a lean face, a sharp-edged nose, prominent cheekbones and dark, deep-set eyes with shaggy black eyebrows, Bellamy is in prime condition. He is 300 years old and takes boosterspice, although he was born before that drug became available; initially, like all humans before boosterspice, he relied on the organ banks to keep him healthy. An outgoing, interesting man, Bellamy talks well; he tells old jokes but does it well, and he has some new ones, too. While not xenophobic, Bellamy tends to not think of aliens as people; Beowulf Shaeffer remembers that he had said they should wipe out the Kzinti for good and all.

Bellamy is the leader of a hunting party visiting Gummidgy when the Kdatlyno touch-sculptor Lloobee is kidnapped. When Shaeffer discovers that Bellamy is part of the kidnap plot, he and Emil Horne are captured by the kidnappers who intend to stage their deaths as an accident. Lloobee creates a diversion, allowing Shaeffer to escape, and Bellamy pursues him. Shaeffer rams Bellamy's ship with his aircar, forcing Bellamy to land, but neither Shaeffer nor Bellamy notice that the front landing leg of his ship fails to deploy, leaving the ship balancing with its gyros alone. When Bellamy tries to save his ship, it flips end-for-end, throwing him into the air to his death. Bellamy probably had a romantic relationship with fellow kidnapper Tanya Wilson; Margo Tellefsen told Shaeffer that Wilson might attempt to kill him in revenge for Bellamy's death. He also wonders if Bellamy's age was a factor in his decision to kidnap Lloobee; when a person lives for hundreds of years and their politics and morals change over time, Shaeffer wondered, did they become indifferent to the idea of morality?

Bellamy appears in the Beowulf Shaeffer story "Grendel".

=== Teela Brown ===
Teela Brown is a member of the crew recruited by Puppeteer Nessus for an expedition to the Ringworld. Her sole qualification was that she was descended from six generations of "lucky" ancestors, winners of Earth's Birthright Lottery. She led such a charmed and worry-free life that she was emotionally immature and unprepared for "harsh reality." The Puppeteers had secretly been trying to breed humans for the psionic power of good luck. Nessus chooses Teela in the hope she would bring luck and success to his expedition.

Teela is a descendant of a former lover of Louis Wu. Her age in Ringworld is given as twenty, though there are conflicting data in later books. She joins the Ringworld expedition, and eventually becomes separated from the group. She meets a Ringworld native called Seeker, and decides to remain with him on the Ringworld while the remainder of the crew departs.

In The Ringworld Engineers, when a second expedition returns to the Ringworld, it is revealed that Teela has become a Protector-stage human. Her new instincts force her to protect the Ringworld population. When she realizes those instincts are driving her toward an unacceptable choice, she manipulates the other characters into killing her.

Further details of her life emerge in three more novels. Her story is the subject of guesswork and deduction by the other characters, and subject to inconsistent retconning among the works. The influence of her luck is a significant factor.

According to the story in Ringworld (expanded in the Known Space novel Juggler of Worlds), the Puppeteers intervened with human reproduction for at least six generations, seeking to breed humans (finding them comfortable and profitable) for an inheritable psionic ability for luck. They suspected such an ability was latent in humans already, having come to regard humanity as an unusually lucky species. The plan worked by manipulating the reproductive laws of Earth. To stem overcrowding, there were strict birth control laws, limiting the number of children each person could have. The Puppeteers covertly manipulated the Birthright Lottery (created to offset excess emigration and deaths), whereby anyone could win the right to have more children. Since the winners are chosen at random, luckier people would have more children, who would hopefully inherit that luck, which would become stronger with each generation of winners.

In Ringworld's Children, it is revealed that Teela Brown and Seeker had a child, who remained on the Ringworld after the end of the Fringe War. Louis speculates that Teela's luck might work for the survival of her genes, rather than Teela herself.

The existence and nature of Teela's luck is debated back and forth by the characters throughout the four-book series. For most of Ringworld, Louis is skeptical of the idea. But by the end of the series Louis says he believes the luck is real, because he sees no other explanation for the unlikely coincidences that have benefited her.

Niven has described the problems that such a character and such a trait pose to his story and to his fictional universe. He calls it "Author Control" to illustrate the plot and story limitations it imposes on the creative process. The story "Safe at Any Speed" is set in a time when the Teela gene is more common among humans. Niven says there will not be more stories from this time: "Stories about infinitely lucky people tend to be dull." This indicates that the author felt constrained to develop story lines around Teela consistent with the view that luck is genetic and inheritable—any hardship inflicted upon Teela which appears unlucky on first glance must thereafter be revealed as concealing a silver lining of greater import in order to maintain indeterminacy, at the expense of dissipating plot tension (Teela was never in any danger really)—regardless of the views expressed by various characters within the narrative.

Teela can also be viewed as a lampshade trope, by bending narrativium to function as a plot device ("a hero will always win when outnumbered, since million-to-one chances are dramatic enough to crop up nine times out of ten").

=== Lucas Garner ===
Lucar Garner appears in World of Ptavvs, Protector and The Defenseless Dead.

=== Gil Hamilton ===
Gilbert Gilgamesh Hamilton is a detective. He is often called "Gil the Arm", both due to his affiliation with the ARM world police force, and his unusual psychic ability.

Born in Topeka, Kansas, to flatlander parents near the end of the 21st century (it is established he was born in the month of April, but 2086, 2091, 2093, and 2097 are all given as years in various stories), he emigrates to the Belt as soon as he becomes an adult. There he begins work on an arduous ten-year apprenticeship towards the acquisition of his singleship licence, working as a member of small, multi-person crews.

After completing several successful trips, Gil is nearly killed. While attempting to move an asteroid with explosives, crew leader "Cubes" Forsythe miscalculates, which results in the destruction of the valuable rock. A fast moving piece of shrapnel penetrates the ship, slicing off Gil's arm and killing Forsythe. The remaining crewmember, Owen Jennison, stops Gil's bleeding and manages to get him to life-saving medical facilities in time. While recuperating from his injury, Gil broods over his future as a Belter.

In the low gravity of Ceres base, Gil discovers that he has a psi power. His brain, still remembering the "image" of his lost arm, can use it much as he did the flesh-and-blood arm. He can feel and manipulate objects via ESP and telekinesis, respectively. Finding a third crewman, Homer Chandrasekhar, they make several highly profitable trips over the following year. Gil finds his "imaginary arm", though not strong, to be a valuable asset, as he can reach through walls and even into vacuum. After six months, Gil has earned enough to repay all his medical fees, with a comfortable cash reserve left over.

Despite much disapproval from Owen and Homer, Gil decides to return to Earth and seek to get his citizenship back. On Earth, he can easily get a transplant to replace his missing arm. In the Belt he would have to pay exorbitantly high fees for a transplant, or settle for a prosthetic. Gil, by a quirk of his own nature, can not live with a prosthetic.

Gil receives his new arm, but finds he can still dissociate his imaginary arm from his real one, and reach through walls, flesh, and even vidphone screens to manipulate objects he sees in them. Shortly afterward, Gil finds out that his new arm had not come from a condemned criminal as he had hoped, but from the captured stock of "organleggers", black market dealers in illicit organ transplants. To make amends, Gil joins the ARM, the elite global police force.

As an ARM, Hamilton is a high-tech detective, who hunts organleggers and other criminals for a living. With his unusual psi power, he is formidable and highly feared among his enemies.

His exploits are detailed in six "Gil 'the Arm' Hamilton" stories. The stories are noir style, told in first person, and frequently involve exotic technology and locked room mysteries:

- Death by Ecstasy (1969)
- The Defenseless Dead (1973)
- ARM (1975): Hamilton is called to the scene of a murder. The victim is Dr. Raymond Sinclair, a brilliant scientist who has invented a mysterious device that creates a bubble of accelerated time. The murder scene is a locked apartment at the top of a high-rise, where the prime suspect is a beautiful young woman who Gil refuses to believe is the killer.
- The Patchwork Girl (1980)
- The Woman in Del Rey Crater (1995)
- "Sacred Cow" (2022) written with Steven Barnes

The Long Arm of Gil Hamilton (1976) contains the first three novellas. Flatlander (1995) (ISBN 0-345-39480-1) is a collection of the first five Gil Hamilton novellas and novels.

=== Emil Horne ===
Emil Horne, a native of Jinx, is a top-flight computer programmer. He meets Beowulf Shaeffer on a trip from Down to Gummidgy and they struck up a quick friendship. Horne is short and strongly built like most natives of Jinx, a high-gravity world. His ability to ask the right questions when programming complex problems also helps him deduce the probable identities of the kidnappers when the Kdatlyno touch sculptor Lloobee is kidnapped from the Argos as it was about to enter Gummidgy system. Despite Shaeffer's caution and some misleading comments that led Horne to believe he was wrong about Larchmont Bellamy and his crew being the kidnappers (Horne wasn't wrong but Shaeffer didn't want him running in with stun-guns blazing), they are taken prisoner when they attempt to infiltrate the location where Lloobee is being held, a cave created with a Slaver disintegrator tool, which Horne locates by having Shaeffer fly high above the ground to see the dust created by the tool. When he attempts to enter the cave, however, a stun-gun set in the "on" position and facing the door renders Horne unconscious. He is returned along with Lloobee after Shaeffer escapes from the kidnappers with Lloobee's help.

Emil Horne appears in the Beowulf Shaeffer story "Grendel" and is mentioned in the story "The Borderland of Sol".

=== Sharrol Janss ===
Sharrol Janss, a native of Earth, is Beowulf Shaeffer's wife and the mother of their daughter Jeena and another child, name unknown, whom she was pregnant with when Shaeffer encountered Ander Smittarasheed on Fafnir in 2655. Sharrol first met Shaeffer on Earth when she picked his pocket, and was later formally introduced to him by Dianna and Elephant as a fourth for bridge. Sharrol also has two children by Carlos Wu, Tanya and Louis, as part of an arrangement between the three so that Bey and Sharrol could raise children together on Earth. Sharrol suffers from Flatland Phobia, a fear of changes to a person's environment, gravity, etc. which makes them psychologically unable to bear space travel or being away from Earth. She was employed at the time she met Shaeffer as a computer analyst for Donovan's Brains, Inc. She had been previously employed by the Epcot-Atlanta police. During her childhood her father ran a lobster ranch in Boston. She was able to travel to Fafnir asleep inside Carlos Wu's special autodoc and later was frozen for travel to Home when Smittarasheed located Shaeffer on Fafnir.

Sharrol Janss appears in the stories "Flatlander", "Procrustes" and "Ghost", and is mentioned in the stories "Grendel" and "The Borderland of Sol".

=== Alice Jordan ===
Alice Jordan is a Belter and a Goldskin, a member of the Belt Police in the mid-twenty-fourth century. Together with flatlander Roy Truesdale, they set out for the Kuiper Belt in search of Jack Brennan, a human turned Protector who has been abducting humans for study in the novel Protector.

In Destroyer of Worlds (by Niven and Edward M. Lerner), Alice is found by Outsiders in a stasis field in a singleship. They sell the singleship containing her to Sigmund Ausfaller, who releases her from stasis. Ausfaller deduces that Brennan put Alice in stasis and sent her far from the danger described in Protector because she is pregnant with his descendant. Alice later becomes involved with Louis Wu, in (by the same authorial team) Betrayer of Worlds and Fate of Worlds.

=== Nessus ===
Nessus is a member of the technologically advanced alien race known to humans as Pierson's Puppeteers, and amongst themselves as Citizens.

Nessus, like almost all Puppeteers ever met by humans, is insane by Puppeteer standards. Sane Puppeteers are far too cautious (cowardly from the human perspective) to go off-world or interact with non-Puppeteers, so only insane individuals like Nessus can manage to act as business liaisons or ambassadors to other species, as he does with humans and others. Nessus demonstrates traits that in humans would be diagnosed as manic-depressive disorder, displacement, and at times, extreme suggestibility. His interactions with humans cause him to be one of the few Puppeteers to ever show any support for Human interests as coequal to Puppeteer interests. He is also directly responsible for the presence of Sigmund Ausfaller on New Terra.

Nessus is featured in the short story "The Soft Weapon" (printed in the 1968 collection Neutron Star) and is one of the expeditionaries to the Ringworld in the 1970 book of the same name. Nessus is also a central character of the Fleet of Worlds series of Ringworld companion novels (Fleet of Worlds, Juggler of Worlds, Destroyer of Worlds, Betrayer of Worlds, and Fate of Worlds), which opens about 200 years before Ringworld and ends following Ringworld's Children.

=== Peter Nordbo ===
Peter Nordbo is an astronomer and noble on Wunderland, who during the First Man-Kzin War was pressed into service for the Kzin following their occupation of the world. At the height of the occupation, he discovered a source of bizarre radiation on a world many lightyears away, and was taken to investigate by the scientifically minded Kzin who oversaw him.

During the flight, forces under Buford Early and Ulf Reichstein Markham liberated Wunderland, and Nordbo was convicted of collaboration and stripped of all of his possessions. In order to secure his release and clear his name, his daughter Tyra secured the help of Robert Saxtorph and his ship to investigate. They found that Peter had discovered a remnant of the Tnuctipun, a black hole powered hyperdrive that could also be used as a powerful Hawking radiation beam weapon. Peter had freed himself from the Kzinti and was reunited with Tyra, and after the weapon was destroyed by the Kzin, returned to Wunderland to free his name.

=== Gregory Pelton ===
Gregory Pelton (aka "Elephant" for a certain anatomical resemblance to a feature of the large Earth land animal), a native of Earth, is probably the richest human alive. His great-to-the-eighth grandmother invented the transfer booth. It is rumored that he actually owns known space, and gets income from renting it out, and that General Products Corporation is actually a front for him.

Pelton lives in a house on the side of a cliff in the Rocky Mountains on Earth, and having spent a lot of time in space resents being called a flatlander. Pelton is of average height but strongly built, looking not so much overweight as solid. Most humans in this period of time on Earth are in excellent health, with autodocs to maintain their bodies and boosterspice to prevent aging; Pelton presumably uses both.

Pelton and Beowulf Shaeffer's personalities tend to complement each other, and they quickly made friends when Shaeffer first encountered him aboard the Lensman, bound for Earth from Jinx after Shaeffer's fateful trip to the core of the Milky Way galaxy. Pelton can be cordial and pleasant but also very direct and blunt when it suits him. He is patient but his patience has limits, and while he is as cautious as anyone he can sometimes act without thinking, a trait that would have gotten him killed if Shaeffer had not talked him out of landing on the protosun's planet when they visited it in 2645: the planet, which they named "Cannonball Express", was composed of antimatter, which would have destroyed even Pelton's General Products-hulled ship, the Slower Than Infinity. Indeed, the hull eventually disintegrated due to annihilations by exposure to antimatter particles from the Fast Protosun's solar wind, but Pelton and Shaeffer were able to escape and managed to return to Jinx.

After Shaeffer and Pelton returned from Cannonball Express, Pelton made plans to revisit it but when government agencies became involved the plan bogged down in details. Ander Smittarasheed told Shaeffer that as of 2655 it was unclear whether Pelton was still involved in the project at all. Shaeffer and Pelton maintained contact after the trip to Cannonball Express; when Shaeffer secretly emigrated to Fafnir with Sharrol, their children, and Carlos Wu and Feather Filip, Elephant gave him the money he had received from General Products Corporation for the indemnity on his General Products hull. The money was deposited on accounts in Fafnir and Home, where the group planned to emigrate to, using assumed identities, after secretly arriving on Fafnir.

Gregory Pelton appears in the Beowulf Shaeffer story Flatlander and was mentioned in the stories Grendel, The Borderland of Sol and Ghost.

In Juggler of Worlds, Pelton is powerful enough to control the SecGen of the fictional UN, and becomes a wanted criminal on the run, the authors' way of explaining why he never returns to the Known Space universe.

=== Regional President of We Made It ===
This Pierson's Puppeteer, a native of the Fleet-of-Worlds working for General Products in Known Space, hires Beowulf Shaeffer to pilot a spaceship in a close fly-by of newly discovered neutron star BVS-1 to discover what killed the first two explorers to make the attempt, Peter and Sonya Laskin. After Shaeffer's return from BVS-1, the puppeteer also agrees to pay Shaeffer one million stars in return for his silence concerning whether the puppeteer homeworld had a moon.

The Regional President of We Made It appears in the Beowulf Shaeffer story "Neutron Star".

=== Regional President of Jinx ===
This puppeteer (called "Honey" by an overly-tired Beowulf Shaeffer at one point, due to his female-sounding voice) also worked for General Products. He contracted with Shaeffer to pilot a Quantum II hyperdrive ship (named Long Shot by Shaeffer) to the core of the Milky Way galaxy, where Shaeffer discovers the core explosion.

The Regional President of Jinx appears in the Beowulf Shaeffer story "At the Core".

=== Ulf Reichstein-Markham ===
Ulf Reichstein-Markham was born on Wunderland in 2390, the son of a Solar System Belter. Following the occupation of Wunderland by the Kzinti in the First Man-Kzin War, at the age of 18 he joined the "Free Wunderland Navy", what purported to be a resistance group but was little more than a band of space pirates occupying the Serpent Swarm (Alpha Centauri's asteroid belt). He was responsible for the capture of the United Nations spaceship Catskinner, whose crew were later responsible for the assassination of Chuut-Riit. He also came under the control of a Thrint who escaped its Slaver stasis field before being destroyed by the Catskinner AI.

By the time Wunderland was liberated in 2420, Reichstein-Markham had become an admiral, and then was chosen to be Minister of War for the free Wunderlander government. He finally died in the year 2443 after being selected to chair the Interworld Commission, an early form of pan-Human government established after the peace treaty with the Kzin was signed. Prior to his death, he had used his position to give the secret of hyperdrive to the Kzin disguised as a diplomatic packet, in the hopes of creating a lasting peace of equality between the two races. Although he did not live to see it, Reichstein-Markham's treachery meant that, far from his intentions, the Kzin would grow strong enough to launch four additional wars of conquest against the Human worlds.

=== Beowulf Shaeffer ===
Beowulf Shaeffer is a crashlander, a descendant of Earth explorers who colonized the planet We Made It, which orbits the star Procyon. He is the central figure of several stories which revolve around his dealings with Pierson's Puppeteers and human characters in unusual and potentially dangerous activities, which often test his wits and courage to see them through to completion.

Shaeffer’s first appearance is in the short story "Neutron Star" in 1966. Niven wrote six short stories between 1966 and 1993 and added a framing story ("Ghost") which ties them all together in the fix-up collection Crashlander. Shaeffer also appears in the story "Fly-by-Night" and in Juggler of Worlds, second book in the Fleet of Worlds series. His known activities span the Timeline of Known Space from 2622, when he became chief pilot of Nakamura Lines, to 2655 when he emigrated to the planet Home with his wife Sharrol and their children.

==== Physical characteristics ====
In the first several Known Space stories featuring him, Shaeffer is described as very tall and thin, and an albino. His height is given in the story "Procrustes" as 6 feet, 11 inches. In the story "Grendel" Jinxian Emil Horne estimated his weight at 160 pounds (about 73 kilograms). Like most albinos Shaeffer's skin is pale, his hair white and his eyes pink. He uses tannin-secretion pills to protect himself against UV radiation under normal (Earthly or Jinxian) sunlight. Shaeffer's long, thin body is extremely flexible; he has startled both Sigmund Ausfaller and Sharrol Janss at different times with his habit of smoking tabac sticks using his toes.

Nakamura Lines ran its ships at one standard Earth gravity, so Shaeffer had to train hard just to walk around comfortably on his own ship during flights. He also spent four years on Earth after meeting Sharrol Janss, adding muscle along his long bones that is not readily apparent from his thin appearance. As a spaceship pilot he considers himself to have a fairly fast reaction time.

After the events of "Procrustes" Shaeffer's height was given as 5 feet 10 and one-half inches, and his muscles were acclimated to the gravity of Fafnir. The gravity of Fafnir is unknown, but not the same and probably greater than that of Earth. Shaeffer is still an albino because the changes to his body did not alter his genetic makeup.

==== Personality ====
Shaeffer tends to be pragmatic and discretionary in his outlook, activities and affairs, although he has been prodded to acts of unseemly courage by circumstances and, in a few rare cases, personal choice. He has been described as a survivor but lazy, doing what needs to be done but only at the last possible moment. He tends to be a womanizer, having formed the habit while at Nakamura Lines of making the acquaintance of the prettiest female aboard his ships during space voyages. He also considers himself a born tourist, and when traveling to a new location he will find and read up on as much local geography, flora and fauna, and culture and traditions as he can.

Shaeffer is something of a spendthrift, especially in his younger years, and is frequently in need of income. In the short story "Neutron Star" he is deeply in debt when he is approached by the regional president of General Products on We Made It to duplicate the near fly-by of neutron star BVS-1, which had killed researchers Peter and Sonya Laskin. The money he earns duplicating (and surviving) the fly-by, plus the money he blackmails out of the puppeteers, kept him solvent for some time, but the regional president of General Products on Jinx remarked in 2645 that Shaeffer had spent more than a million stars in the previous four years, to which Shaeffer replied, "And loved it."

Shaeffer is gregarious, making friends easily, and is in general a friendly and affable person. He befriends a flatlander called Elephant during a flight from Jinx to Earth, and Emil Horne on the flight from Down to Gummidgy as well as the captain of the Argos, Margo Tellefsen. He is able to talk cordially and easily with most alien races, such as the Outsiders and puppeteers; only a few such as Grogs or Kzinti give him cause for worry.

Shaeffer is not above engaging in illegal activities if there is a need or even profit in it. He intended to steal a puppeteer-provided ship rather than attempt a close fly-by of a neutron star. He considered killing Ander Smittarasheed rather than allowing him to jeopardize the safety of his wife Sharrol and their children. He witnesses the killing of Sigmund Ausfaller by Smittarasheed and says nothing to the Fafnir authorities, although he did attempt to warn Smittarasheed that the same ARM punchgun that killed Ausfaller was also linked with the death of a human the Fafnir authorities were aware of.

==== History ====
Very little is known of Shaeffer's early life. It is known he was raised in a large home on We Made It (as related in "Flatlander"), and is presumably from a wealthy family. He is presumably descended from a number of chronologically earlier Shaeffers in the Known Space universe: Charles Martin "Lit" Shaeffer (First Speaker of the Belt Political Section in World of Ptavvs and "At the Bottom of a Hole"), Marion Shaeffer (a Belter policewoman in The Patchwork Girl) and Brobdig Shaeffer (a Crashlander hyperspace engineer in "The Heroic Myth of Lieutenant Nora Argamentine").

If he was made chief pilot for Nakamura Lines in 2622, as sources indicate, and this occurred shortly after graduation from a four-year college education majoring in starship piloting, entered at age 18, Shaeffer would have been born about 2600.

Shaeffer's interest in flying developed during his childhood in Crashlanding City at Crashlanding Port where he and other youngsters observed spaceships coming and going as well as the people who arrived and departed on them. Of those youths, Bey was the only one who went on to become a pilot. He attended college on We Made It where he presumably took courses in spaceship piloting; he related some aspects of courses he had taken to Elephant while they were exploring the antimatter protostar and planet.

In 2622 he was made chief pilot for Nakamura Lines, a space cruise company on We Made It. He flew for Nakamura Lines until a stock market crash in 2639 forced the company to fold, leaving Shaeffer unemployed on We Made It but with the expectation of back pay, against which he continued to live comfortably for the next two years. However, he never received any back pay from Nakamura Lines or the bankruptcy courts.

In 2641, nearing the limit of his credit, Shaeffer is approached by a Pierson's Puppeteer, the Regional President of General Products on We Made It, with a proposal for work. In return for paying Shaeffer's debts and a half-million additional stars, Shaeffer would make a close fly-by of neutron star BVS-1 in an attempt to discover what had killed two humans, Peter and Sonya Laskin, who first attempted the fly-by. GP hulls are known to be effectively invulnerable, and the company is extremely interested in finding out what could get through them. Their interest is largely financial; they are concerned that the low insurance rates their hulls traditionally enjoyed would be increased. Shaeffer agrees to the mission, but plans to steal the ship. This plan is interrupted when an ARM agent, Sigmund Ausfaller, plants a bomb in the ship's lifesystem in order to ensure Shaeffer completed the mission, in order to maintain human-puppeteer relations. Shaeffer duplicates the Laskins' experiment and determines they were killed by tidal effects during the close approach, effects that almost kill him as well. Returning to We Made It, Shaeffer learns that puppeteers seem not to understand tides, implying that their world has no moon. He blackmails the regional president of General Products on We Made It for one million stars.

Four years later, in 2645, Shaeffer is on Jinx when he is again approached by the puppeteers, this time by the Regional President of General Products on Jinx. Puppeteers have developed the Quantum II hyperdrive, capable of traveling one light-year every 1.25 minutes, but the engineering is unwieldy and requires further research to become more useful. The puppeteers hire Shaeffer to travel to the core of the Milky Way galaxy as a publicity stunt in the ship, which Shaeffer names the Long Shot. In doing so, Shaeffer learns that the core of the galaxy has exploded and a wave of hard radiation is spreading outward. In about twenty thousand years it will pass through known space, rendering all the worlds there uninhabitable. When Shaeffer returns to Jinx he discovers that General Products has become defunct and that all puppeteers have disappeared.

Traveling to Earth in that same year, Bey encounters Gregory Pelton, a wealthy flatlander who dislikes being called a flatlander, and they become friends. In an effort to do something really unusual, Pelton meets with an Outsider ship to buy information about the most unusual world in known space. Shaeffer, in gratitude for Pelton's help in showing him around Earth (and for getting him introduced to Sharrol Janss), offers to pilot the ship for Pelton. They examine the system the Outsiders sold them information on until Pelton's General Products-hulled ship suddenly disintegrates. Pelton is determined to land anyway but Shaeffer convinces him that unless he can explain what happened to the hull he should return to Jinx to collect the indemnity on the hull. Arriving on Jinx, Shaeffer and Pelton learn that the system they visited was composed of antimatter, which annihilated enough atoms of the General Product's hull (composed of a single large molecule) to cause the molecule to unravel. Shaeffer returns to Earth with Pelton and he and Sharrol move in together in Nome.

Bey and Sharrol begin to explore options for having children together. As an albino, the Fertility Board of Earth will not grant Bey a parenthood license. Sharrol, who has Flatland Phobia, cannot leave Earth for a planet that will allow her and Shaeffer to have children. Finally, in 2648, they decide to ask one of Sharrol's friends, Carlos Wu, a registered genius with an unlimited parenthood license because of his intelligence and resistance to disease and injury, to help them have children. Bey leaves Earth for two years, and is traveling from Down to Gummidgy aboard the ship Argos, captained by Margo Tellefsen. Also on board is the Kdatlyno touch-sculptor Lloobee. When Lloobee is kidnapped just outside Gummidgy system, Shaeffer and a fellow passenger, Jinxian Emil Horne, team up to discover who the kidnappers are. They locate Lloobee but are captured; Shaeffer escapes when Lloobee leaps at one of the kidnappers, distracting them while Shaeffer flees. He manages to get to his car and heads back toward the spaceport. Bellamy, leader of the kidnappers, pursues him and Shaeffer rams Bellamy's ship, damaging his own ship and crashing it. Bellamy lands but his ship is unstable due to a landing leg not extending and the ship crashes, killing Bellamy. Later, with Lloobee and Emil rescued, Bey agrees to spend two years with Margo Tellefsen while waiting for Sharrol and Carlos to have two children for Bey and Sharrol to raise on Earth. Tanya is born in 2649 and Louis in 2650.

In 2650, Shaeffer is trying to return to Earth from Jinx but a series of ship disappearances around Earth system is making ship captains wary of returning there. Running into Carlos Wu at the Institute of Knowledge, Bey also learns that Sigmund Ausfaller is attempting to return to Earth and Carlos decides to join him. Bey joins as well, despite his dislike for Ausfaller; it has been too long since he's seen Sharrol. Just before reaching the hyperdrive breakout point at Sol system the ship's hyperdrive inexplicably disappears. Carlos theorizes that a high gravity gradient would have caused the motor to take off at a higher level of hyperdrive. They approach a scientist living in cometary halo, Julian Forward, and learn that he has captured a quantum black hole and is using it to make ships disappear. They manage to stop him and Forward is killed by the quantum black hole.

Resuming life on Earth, Shaeffer learns in 2654 that Carlos Wu has an agenda of his own. He and his companion, Feather Filip, ask Bey and Sharrol and their children to secretly emigrate to Fafnir. Feather has been an ARM "schiz" (a paranoid schizophrenic) for 35 years and is about to be retired; she knows the ARM will not let her leave Earth or have children under Earth's Fertility Laws. Filip finds a ship that will accommodate the group and Carlos' special autodoc. When they arrive at Fafnir, however, Feather shoots Shaeffer and Carlos escapes with the children. Sharrol kills Feather, feeds her body into Carlos' autodoc as biomass material, and removes Shaeffer's head and places it in the intensive care cavity of the 'doc. The 'doc rebuilds Shaeffer over a four-month period, but his height is adjusted to match the intensive care cavity and his rebuilt muscles are adapted to Fafnir's gravity. His new height is 5 feet, 10 and one-half inches. Locating Sharrol, they let Carlos know that they are alive, that Feather is dead, and that they will rejoin him sometime in the future, when they are ready to make the trip.

In 2655, while at a water war game, Shaeffer is found by Ander Smittarasheed, who is gathering information for Sigmund Ausfaller about puppeteers. Shaeffer recounts his adventures over the last fifteen years to Smittarasheed and attempts to sell him the location of Carlos Wu's autodoc, a valuable prize to the ARM since its technology is based on nanotechnology. He represents Carlos and Sharrol to Ander as dead, killed by Feather, who is presumed still at large. Ausfaller, also on Fafnir, plans to take Shaeffer into custody but is killed by Ander using the same weapon that Feather shot Shaeffer with a year and a half earlier, a punchgun. Shaeffer and Sharrol manage to escape to Home with their daughter Jeena and their unborn child, leaving Ander to take the blame (rightly) for Ausfaller's death.

Official questioning by Fafnir cops about the fate of Ausfaller result in a boarding delay, allowing Beowulf to travel to Home as an upgraded First Class passenger aboard Odysseus, the same ship that Sharrol and Jeena travel Ice Class (cryogenic suspension). Due to a raid by Kzinti pirates claiming to be operatives of The Longest War (a kzinti term for evolution, also used for deniable Patriarch operatives), he encounters fellow passengers Fly-By-Night, a latent Kzinti Telepath from the covert joint human-kzinti colony of Sheathclaws, and Fly-By-Night's Jotok slave Paradoxical (Par-Rad-Doc-Sic-Cal). When a cargo module with a one-in-three chance of having Beowulf's wife and child are taken as hostages, he joins Fly-By-Night and Paradoxical as prisoners of the pirates. Working together, they overcome the kzinti pirates, and arrive safely at Home.

=== Lit Shaeffer ===
Charles Martin Shaeffer is nicknamed "Little" Shaeffer and is known to most of his friends simply as "Lit". A Belter, born in the late 21st century, he is First Speaker for the Belt Political Section when Kzanol the thrint is revived from stasis in the early 22nd century. He is friends with Lucas Garner and has visited with him at least once on Farmer's Asteroid, one of the Belt Bubbleworlds. Lit's nickname comes from the fact that he spent a good deal of time in low and zero-g during his body's growth period, and is now unusually tall. The Shaeffer family is very active in Belt politics, and are likely ancestors of Beowulf Shaeffer, but this is never established definitively.

Lit Shaeffer is featured in the novels World of Ptavvs, Protector and in the short story "At the Bottom of a Hole".

=== Ander Smittarasheed ===
Ander Smittarasheed, a native of Earth, is hired by Beowulf Shaeffer to ghostwrite his neutron star story, and again four years later to write his galactic core story. Athletic and well-built, easily able to have any woman for the asking, Ander tends to dress in wild flatlander style even when offworld. He has a square face, thin blond hair and a solid-looking jaw that Shaeffer compared to a prey turtle's.

Ander presents himself as cool yet affable, but manages to come off (at least to Shaeffer) as being smug. When Shaeffer advertises for a ghostwriter after his neutron star episode, Ander answers and manages to push himself into the situation before Shaeffer's guard is completely up. He is a very competent writer, which surprises Shaeffer, and the neutron star recording sells well, as does the core piece they do together four years later. That is the last Shaeffer sees of Ander until he appears on Fafnir ten years later, looking for him.

Ander is in the employ of Sigmund Ausfaller, an ARM and agent for the Bureau of Alien Affairs. Ander was tasked with finding Shaeffer and questioning him about the threat level of certain alien races, notably the puppeteers. This may have been done to delay Shaeffer until Ausfaller could arrive and take him into custody, but Ander did not have time to contact Ausfaller until after his initial interview with the crashlander. However, when Shaeffer offers to sell Ander the location of Carlos Wu's nanotech autodoc, Ander understands the impact of such technology (evidenced by Shaeffer's altered appearance) and is interested in spite of himself.

The lure of Carlos Wu's special autodoc proves too tempting for Ander. When Ausfaller appears to take Shaeffer into custody, along with local money (probably for bribing local officials; he never intended to give it to Shaeffer), Ander kills him with the ARM punchgun that Sharrol left in Shaeffer's hotel room and Ander took, and offers to split the money with Shaeffer for the location of Carlos's autodoc. Shaeffer agrees but leaves Fafnir without the money, knowing that the Fafnir police can link the punchgun to another crime, a survival jacket with a ragged hole through it, made by the same weapon. In Ander's possession, the weapon would be link him to that death as well as Ausfaller's. And Shaeffer knew that Ander did not reckon on just how many Fafnir police were Kzinti who had elected to stay on that world when it was acquired by Earth in the Fourth Man-Kzin War. Ander's final fate is revealed in Juggler of Worlds, where he is killed in a firefight with Kzinti Fafnir police.

Ander Smittarasheed appears in the framing story "Ghost".

=== Nick Sohl ===
Nicholas Brewster Sohl is a Belter, born in the mid 21st century. He is First Speaker for the Belt Political Section when Phssthpok the Pak Protector arrives in the Solar System in the early 22nd century.

Sohl and Lucas Garner track Phssthpok and Jack Brennan to Mars, where they find that Brennan has become a Protector himself, and has killed Phssthpok.

=== Speaker-to-Animals ===
Speaker-to-Animals (later known as Chmeee) is a junior diplomat, trained to deal with other species without reflexively killing them. He is recruited by Nessus, a Pierson's Puppeteer, as a member of an expedition to explore the Ringworld.

Speaker is a Kzin, a member of an extraterrestrial race of large, tiger-like beings. He is a trained diplomat posted to the United Nations. His title (in place of a name he has yet to earn) is a barely-polite reference to how Kzinti refer to non-Kzin races. Following their return to Known Space, he is given the name of "Chmeee" (the "ch" is pronounced like a guttural German "ch", as in "ach") and given breeding rights by the Kzinti Patriarch. In the sequel The Ringworld Engineers Chmeee, along with Louis Wu, is kidnapped by the Hindmost (the exiled leader of the Puppeteers), who wants Louis and Chmeee to uncover the secret behind the creation of the Ringworld. Chmeee appears briefly in The Ringworld Throne and Ringworld's Children. His son, Acolyte, is a supporting character in these novels. As a member of the Kzin species, Speaker-to-Animals is extremely dangerous and always ready to fight despite the fact that he is a diplomat. He is the one that causes the most damage to the Ringworld village of Zignamuclikclik, and were he not a part of the Docile Kzinti project, he probably would have leveled the village to the ground. He is also responsible for the expedition's safety on Ringworld and therefore is in charge most of the time.

Chmeee is approximately 8 feet (2.4 m) tall and weighs 400–500 pounds (180–230 kg). He, like all kzinti, is covered with a thick coat of long fur that comes in various combinations of orange, yellow, and black. His face has black fur across the eyes resembling a bandit's mask, or the facial markings of a raccoon. His tail is naked and similar in appearance to a rat's tail. Kzinti ears are hairless, pink, and shaped liked a segment of a Chinese parasol (or cocktail umbrella); they can fold back flat against the head for protection during a fight. Chmeee is badly burned during Ringworld; and as a result, his body becomes covered with scars. After he involuntarily receives an injection of the Kzinti analog of boosterspice, his scarring gradually disappears. However, he acquires new scars after a fight with a Pak protector in The Ringworld Engineers.

=== Margo Tellefsen ===
Margo Tellefsen, a native of Earth, is the captain of the Argos, bound for Gummidgy, when it is boarded and one of its passengers is kidnapped. She is slim and lovely with long, dark hair that she wears in a "free fall" effect. She has green eyes. Beowulf Shaeffer considers her lovely enough (by flatlander standards) to make a fast fortune on tridee if she wanted to. He believes that Margo is in collusion with the kidnappers, which she confirms when Shaeffer confronts her after his escape. Margo reveals that she is Bellamy's mother and therefore well over 300 years old. She asks him to stay with her for two years while Sharrol and Carlos Wu are having children for Bey and Sharrol to raise on Earth; intrigued by this request, Schaeffer agrees.

Margo Tellefsen appears in the Beowulf Shaeffer story "Grendel".

=== Tanya Wilson ===
Tanya Wilson, a native of Earth, is a companion of Larch Bellamy and one of the four people who kidnap the Kdatlyno touch sculptor Lloobee from the spaceship Argos. Beowulf Shaeffer meets her when he arrives at Elephant's house during lush-hour one day. She is about 300 years old.

Details on her physical appearance are sparse. She has a voice that is rich and fruity, according to Shaeffer, with a flatlander accent that doesn't ring quite true and is probably displaced in time.

When Emil Horne attempts to storm the cave where Lloobee is being held, he stuns Wilson before being stunned himself. After Shaeffer is captured she returns to the campsite, the cover story for her injury being that she was scratched by one of the native species of Gummidgy. After Bellamy's death, Margo Tellefsen, who is Bellamy's mother, warns Shaeffer that Tanya Wilson had been in love with her son and will probably try to kill him.

Tanya Wilson appears in the Beowulf Shaeffer story "Grendel".

=== Carlos Wu ===
Carlos Wu, a native of Earth, is one of only about 120 people with an unlimited parenthood license due to his incredible genius and resistance to disease and injury. His intelligence allowed him to solve the Sealeyham Limits Problem, and to design a new autodoc based on nanotechnology. Along with being a genius mathematician, he is also a playwright and composer. Wu is an easygoing and pleasant fellow, although he broods over feeling trapped by the ARM keeping constant track of his whereabouts and activities. He is reluctant to disclose his thoughts on the cause of ships disappearing near Sol system, even when the hyperdrive in Sigmund Ausfaller's ship, Hobo Kelly, completely disappears as they approach Earth. Carlos and Beowulf Shaeffer are returning to Earth. Bey returns in order to be with his love, Sharrol Janss, and their two children, Tanya and Louis (both of whom were fathered by Carlos). Carlos, perhaps having a resurgence of flatland phobia, has agreed to return there with Ausfaller. Carlos and Bey meet with Dr. Julian Forward and discover that he has found a quantum black hole and is using it to make ships in hyperdrive disappear. Forward takes them hostage and attempts to destroy the Hobo Kelly, but Ausfaller fires on his ships and Shaeffer manages to damage his equipment, causing Forward to temporarily lose control of the quantum black hole; sensing defeat, Forward allows himself to be drawn into it. Ausfaller rescues Bey and Carlos and they continue on to Earth where Bey rejoins Sharrol and their children and Carlos resumes his own life on Earth.

Carlos and Sharrol Janss had a casual sexual relationship before Sharrol met Shaeffer, although Carlos may have been more interested in her than she in him, since he tried to convince her at one point to leave Earth with him because he felt smothered by the overprotective ARMs who were tasked with protecting his life. When Shaeffer and Janss decide to have children but Shaeffer is denied a parenthood license due to his albinism, they agree that Carlos will father two children with Sharrol and she and Bey will raise them.

Eventually Wu formes a relationship with Feather Filip, an ARM agent tasked to protect him, and he and she create a plan to secretly emigrate from Earth. To minimize the chance of being found out they plan to bring others along to disguise the size of their group (the ARM would presumably be looking for two people, not a larger group). They bring Bey and Sharrol into the plan. Feather locates a ship that would transport them to Fafnir. From there, they would take the place of a family named Graynor, a group of two men, two women and two children. That family would secretly emigrate to Wunderland, where Feather had set up funding for them, while they would move on to Home. However, after reaching Fafnir, Feather turns on them, shooting Shaeffer in the chest with the punchgun, to show Carlos what she is capable of, so he would stay with her. Instead, Carlos ran with the children, Tanya and Louis, and manages to emigrate to Home without Feather's help. A year and a half later, when Ander Smittarasheed catches up to Bey and Sharrol on Fafnir, she is frozen for shipment to Home along with their daughter Jeena and their unborn child.

While on Earth, Carlos lives underwater at the United Nations-protected Great Barrier Reef.

Carlos Wu appears in the Beowulf Shaeffer stories "The Borderland of Sol" and "Procrustes", and is mentioned in the stories "Grendel" and "Ghost".

== Fictional alien species ==
In the process of exploring space, humankind encounters several intelligent alien species, including the following (in alphabetical order):

=== Bandersnatch ===
The Bandersnatch (plural bandersnatchi) is a fictional alien species in Larry Niven's Known Space universe. The species is named for Lewis Carroll's Bandersnatch.

Niven's first story to discuss the Bandersnatchi was World of Ptavvs, published in 1966. That story relates the way that they were named as follows:

Winston Doheny, our biologist, took one look at these monsters and dubbed them frumious bandersnatch. This species name is now in the goddam log.

— World of Ptavvs, Larry Niven

Bandersnatchi are described as enormous herd animals, twice the size of an Apatosaurus with a slug-like shape and completely white, slick skin. A sauropod-like neck, with no head, extends about as high as the bandersnatch's body. The tip is thick and rounded, entirely featureless, other than two tufts of black bristles (sense organs). At the front of the body, low to the ground, is a large mouth adapted to scooping a form of mutated yeast out of shallow ocean-like yeast colonies.

Niven's works describe Bandersnatchi as one giant cell with long chromosomes as thick as a human finger, rendering them impervious to the mutagenitive effects of radiation and therefore unable to mutate. As single cells, they reproduce asexually by budding. Their nerves have no cell body and no nuclei; nothing to separate them from other specialized protoplasm. The Bandersnatchi also have 6 large hearts, each weighing about 11 pounds. The brain is large, shaped long and narrow, and is encased in a bony cage. The skull is one end of this jointless, flexible, very strong cage that keeps them from ever shifting position.

The Bandersnatchi were created by the Tnuctipun during the Thrintun empire (c. 1.5 billion BCE) as a food source with a flavor nearly irresistible to the predatory Thrintun. As such, the Thrintun had no objection to their large size. While the Thrintun believed that the Bandersnatchi possessed no intelligence, they were actually sentient beings resistant to the Thrintun's telepathic mind control abilities and were used by the Tnuctipun to spy on the Thrintun until a slave rebellion. This immunity to the Thrintun psychic abilities also allowed them to survive the mass-suicide command used at the end of the Tnuctipun-Thrintun war. However, because Bandersnatchi chromosomes are so thick and resilient that they never mutate, they therefore cannot evolve, and have remained biologically unchanged for the past two billion years.

Bandersnatchi survive on the planet Jinx, with isolated populations also scattered throughout the galaxy, including the planet Beanstalk and the 'Maps of Jinx' in the Great Oceans of the Ringworld. On Jinx, Bandersnatchi allow themselves to be hunted in exchange for specialized tools and devices, such as mechanical 'arms' specifically designed for their massive bodies, along with keeping the Bandersnatchi population in check and providing the humans with something to fight. The hunters' equipment is restricted by agreement to make things more equal; about 40% of the hunters do not return.

Along with Grogs and Dolphins, Bandersnatchi are described as a "Handicapped" (with a capital "H") race, in that they are sentient but do not possess any prehensile limbs.

=== Chunquen ===
The Chunquen are a slave species of the Kzinti, remarkable to their captors for the sentience of both sexes. ("They fought constantly.") Their homeworld is watery; they resisted the Kzinti invasion with missiles fired from submarines. Apparently they were exterminated before the Kzinti first encountered humans.

=== Grogs ===
The Grogs are sessile sentient creatures, shaped like furry cones. They are eyeless, earless, and have a prehensile tongue. They can also control animals telepathically. The Grogs are thought by some to be the descendants of the Thrintun species, after 1.5 billion years of atrophy.

=== Gw'oth ===
The Gw'oth (singular Gw'o) are first encountered in Larry Niven and Edward M. Lerner's collaborative Fleet of Worlds series of novels.

The Gw'oth resemble starfish and inhabit the ocean under the ice of their home world, the moon Jm'ho. When linked together – using a vestigial talent that few Gw'oth retain – they can form a powerful biological computer. One such instance is named Ol't'ro. Ol't'ro is composed of 16 Gw'oth individuals who link themselves together into a 'meld' or ensemble mind called a Gw'otesht. Ol't'ro is featured prominently throughout the Fleet of Worlds series.

Ol't'ro's ultimate fate is unknown after Fate of Worlds. Whether Ol't'ro died in the explosion of planets or somehow escaped is left unanswered. Ol't'ro had just solved the mystery of Quantum II hyperspace travel so it is possible but unconfirmed that the Gw'otesht managed to escape in that fashion.

=== Jotoki ===
The Jotoki (singular Jotok) are first described in the novelette "The Survivor" by Donald Kingsbury, in Man-Kzin Wars IV.

Jotoki resemble large, spindly starfish. They have a torochord (ring-shaped) instead of a notochord, with five "self-sections" (apparently semi-independent brains) that operate the Jotok's body cooperatively. The Jotoki begin life as small aquatic swimmers, most of which are eaten by predators; in time, five of the survivors will merge to form one collective organism, which grows into an arboreal adolescent form; its tails become arms, and its fins differentiate into fingers. When it grows large enough, the Jotok imprints itself on an adult (if one is available) and enters a stage of rapid learning and brain growth. A Jotok who desires a family can simply go into the wilderness and "harvest" an adolescent of the proper age (a property that Kzin slavers later exploit). Unimprinted adult Jotoki are considered feral, and regarded as little more than animals. Since the five subunits that make up one Jotok individual are not necessarily genetically related, reproduction does not require sex; a Jotok can simply find a pond and deposit its offspring to begin the cycle again. Before their enslavement, Jotoki operated in groups called "clanpods", as part of their former planet-wide tradeweb. Details of this arrangement are not known. Jotok technological specialties included gravity polarizers, linguistics and biotechnology. They had the ability to force-grow clones to adulthood.

The Jotoki were also experts at trade. Their interstellar trade empire was quite developed for its time, but after Kzinti were used as mercenaries for many years, the Kzinti revolted and conquered the Jotoki. The Jotoki became the slaves and food-animals of the ferocious Kzinti. In "modern" times (i.e. during most of the Known Space stories), Jotoki are a seldom-seen slave race of the Kzinti. The Kzinti believe that there is a free Jotoki fleet wandering amongst the stars, which would have provided their most strenuous opposition (excepting humans).

In Man-Kzin Wars XI, it is established that surviving Jotoki swimmers inhabited a Wunderland swamp near a crashed Kzin cruiser. Although the swamp was rendered uninhabitable, by the end of the book it is established that humans recovered some Jotoki and are attempting to breed a free Jotok species. The success of this is unknown, since earlier-written but chronologically later Niven works do not mention free Jotoki.

=== Kdatlyno ===
The Kdatlyno are chiefly known for their touch sculpture and their sonar "vision". Their race was formerly subjugated by the Kzinti until freed by the humans.

In appearance they are a physically large and powerful bipedal species with muscular build, rough scaly skin, retractile claws and thick hides, growing up to eight feet tall. They have no eyes, having evolved on a world which instead drove the development of echolocation rather than vision.

Kdatlyno are one of the few sentient races that can physically intimidate an adult Kzin, and there is at least one mention of them being used as elite imperial guards for the Kzinti Patriarch, presumably due to both their great strength and their uninvolvement in Kzin imperial court politics.

The short story "Grendel" features the Kdatlyno Lloobee, a touch-sculptor who works primarily for a human audience.

=== Martians ===
The Martians are primitive but intelligent humanoids who lived beneath the sands. Martians burst into flames when brought in contact with water. Martians killed many of the early human explorers on Mars, principally because they concealed their existence, and they were not suspected. In the novel Protector, the Martians are wiped out when Jack Brennan causes an ice asteroid to crash into the surface of Mars, raising the average humidity of the atmosphere. Some Martians still exist on the "Map of Mars" on the Ringworld.

=== Morlocks ===
The Morlocks are semi-sentient humanoid cave dwellers on Wunderland. They, like humans, descend from a failed attempt by Pak Protectors to colonize Sol and nearby star systems. Named by humans for the creatures in H. G. Wells's The Time Machine.

=== Outsiders ===
The Outsiders are many-limbed beings that are invariably described as a cat o'nine tails with a fattened handle. Their body composition includes ultra-cold superfluid helium. Outsiders are estimated to be the most technologically advanced species in Known Space, possibly the Galaxy, but the extent of their development remains unknown. Though they have the technology to produce faster-than-light drives, they rarely use them, preferring to travel the "slow" way, just below the speed of light. They do possess a "reactionless drive" technology that allows them to reach this speed almost instantaneously. In Ringworld's Children, Louis Wu says that the Outsiders have "something better" than hyperdrive but this is not elaborated on.

They spend all of their time following starseeds and acting as information brokers to space-faring sentient races throughout the Milky Way. Their prices can be very high and scaled to the estimated impact the information will have on the civilization of the client race. Their most common wares are interstellar propulsion systems of various types. The Outsiders maintain a strict commercial ethos regarding any form of knowledge, which shrouds them in a secrecy only wealth can penetrate. They do not haggle. They will answer any question, even those about themselves, if the questioner is willing to pay the price. Personal questions about the Outsiders have been priced beyond the ability of any individual or government to pay (on the order of a trillion credits). In "Peace and Freedom", starseeds are shown to be packages of microorganisms designed to seed new planets with life, thus creating new customers for the Outsiders. They are reluctant to reveal this information because they are ashamed, since one of their starseeds created the Thrintun, a species which destroyed nearly all intelligent life in the galaxy several billion years ago. Another theory behind the Outsiders-Starseed connection is that Starseeds actually carry Outsider 'spores'; as the Outsiders are a small-numbered species their offspring are of great importance to them.

The Outsiders are thought to have evolved on a cold world with no atmosphere, similar to Neptune's moon Nereid, which they lease from the Earth government. They live on thermoelectricity by lying with their heads in sunlight and their tails in shadow; the temperature difference sets up a current. In some of the later Known Space stories it has been suggested that the Outsiders do not use hyperspace as its conditions are lethal to them because they would be unable to generate thermoelectricity. Outsider 'ships' are equipped with an artificial 'sun' for their journeys between systems, but because of the nature of their 'ships' the hyperspace 'blind spot' would absorb this artificial light, killing Outsiders who remained in hyperspace too long. (The canonicity of this material is debatable as it was not written by Niven.)

The novel A Darker Geometry by Gregory Benford and Mark O. Martin stated that the Outsiders were created by a race of extra-dimensional aliens seeking to escape the heat death of their own universe. Edward M. Lerner revealed in an online chat (as 'EML') that Larry Niven had ruled A Darker Geometry as definitely non-canonical and incompatible with the then forthcoming Juggler of Worlds, which was co-authored by Niven and Lerner. Juggler of Worlds introduces a number of possible retcons to established Outsider history.

While in most of the Known Space Series, the name "Outsiders" refers to the aforementioned species, in stories that happen before the discovery of aliens the term "Outsider" refers to any alien that might make contact with mankind.

The Outsiders may have inspired the Melnorme from Star Control 2, another highly advanced and very mysterious species. The Investor species in Shaper/Mechanist stories by Bruce Sterling have a similar ethos but an altogether different biology.

=== Pierin ===
The Pierin are a rare multi-limbed species which developed on a planet with lower gravity than Earth, thus Pierin spend much time in the air. They have horns on their heads and wide membranous wings. They speak in raspy screeches and atonal clicks. Pierin are described as curious and friendly to the point of being nosy. They were able to develop a small space-faring civilization before being enslaved by the Kzin.

Their planet of origin is known as Pierin, orbiting a star in the constellation Reticulum. At some point Human beings tried to ally with them against the Kzin. They eventually were liberated from slavery during the Man-Kzin wars.

=== Thrintun ===
The Thrintun (singular Thrint; also, Slavers) are an ancient species that ruled a large empire, including the region of Known Space, through telepathic mind control about 1.5 billion years ago. A technology created by one of their slave races was the stasis field, which makes its contents impervious to harm and provides indefinite suspended animation, and which has figured in several Known Space stories. Thrintun were small (approximately 1.25 meters tall), highly telepathic but not particularly intelligent (with their mind control, they did not need to be), reptilian, with green scaly skin, pointed teeth, and a single eye. The species was depicted in Barlowe's Guide to Extraterrestrials.

=== Tnuctipun ===
The Tnuctipun (singular Tnuctip) were small, arboreal pack predators, averaging about 3–4 feet long. Their heads were long and lean, and their eyes opened laterally. They were highly intelligent (IQ estimated around 130–140, according to the short story "In the Hall of the Mountain King") and social. As befits their carnivorous nature, they were also ruthless, aggressive, and cunning. Their word for alien most closely translates to "food that talks". Two billion years before humans evolved, the galaxy was ruled by the Thrintun, who telepathically enslaved the Tnuctipun and other species.

The Tnuctipun invented most of the technologies from that era, including stage trees (trees containing solid rocket fuel in their trunks, originally used as cheap rocket boosters, which in the present era of the Known Space universe had evolved to seed themselves across star systems), sunflowers (flowers with integral parabolic mirrors that can focus sunlight to deadly effect), and stasis fields (a time dilation device). They were also known to have direct conversion of mass to energy and a telepathy shield (these two technologies are lost by the time most Niven stories take place). In order for the Tnuctipun to think creatively, the Thrintun allowed them some limited mental freedom. The Tnuctipun used that freedom to stage a rebellion against their masters, the culmination of a carefully thought out, centuries-long plan.

In the novel World of Ptavvs, the protagonist Larry Greenberg, a telepath who reads the mind of a Thrint, theorizes that some of their inventions were traps: Bandersnatchi, thought to be non-sentient livestock, were in fact intelligent, created as spies immune to telepathy. Sunflowers turned against their masters and burned Thrint homes to the ground. Other Tnuctip inventions were designed to shape Thrint society to weaken it. Sunflowers encouraged a trend for the slavers to live in isolated manors, surrounded by slaves. Mutated racing viprin (fast-running creatures raced for entertainment and gambling) ruined the existing viprin herding business, which along with other similar inventions led to an economic depression prior to the Tnuctip revolt.

The war escalated until the Thrintun, rather than accept defeat, employed a device that amplified the sphere of influence of a Thrint's mind control to encompass the entire galaxy. And they gave a simple command: Die. And everything in the galaxy that had evolved a backbone perished, including any Thrintun not protected by a stasis field. The Bandersnatchi were one of the only sentient races that survived this on a large scale, because they were already immune to telepathic commands. This course of events is alluded to in the novel World of Ptavvs and a still functioning suicide amplifier itself is discovered by Hal Colebach in the short story "Peter Robinson", at which point it is destroyed.

Several other Tnuctip inventions are inadvertently discovered in the various known space novels, including a prototype hyperspace shunt, discovered during the first Man-Kzin War (in the novelette Inconstant Star by Poul Anderson). The Kzinti lose the war before they can bring news of it home, and the device itself is lost.

A recent Man-Kzin Wars short story – "Teacher's Pet" by Matthew Joseph Harrington, in Man-Kzin Wars XI – claims that the Tnuctipun are responsible for creating the Pak Protectors. As with most Man-Kzin Wars material, its canonicity has not been confirmed by Niven.

In 1968, Niven worked with Norman Spinrad to draft a story outline entitled Down in Flames, in which much of the history of Known Space is revealed to be a hoax, and in which it is revealed that the Kzin are the Tnuctipun. The outline was published in Tom Reamy's fanzine Trumpet, and released on the internet, but was never intended to be completed or published, and was superseded by the Ringworld series of novels.

=== Trinocs ===
The Trinocs are named for their three eyes; they also have three fingers on each hand and a triangular mouth. They are described as 5-foot-tall (1.5 m) bipedal humanoids, with long legs, short torsos, and improbably flexible neck vertebrae. An unconfirmed source states that they breathe a "primordial reducing atmosphere" mainly composed of methane and ammonia, and are culturally paranoid, at least by human standards. They are first encountered by Louis Wu in the short story "There is a Tide".

=== Whrloo ===
The Whrloo are meter-tall insectoids with long eyestalks; their homeworld has low gravity with a thick, dense atmosphere. They never saw the stars until they were enslaved by the Kzinti.

=== Others ===
Also figuring in some stories are dolphins and other intelligent cetaceans, and various offshoots and relatives of Homo sapiens including the associate lineage of the hominids of the Ringworld. Most life in Known Space shares similar biochemistries, since they evolved from the Thrintun practice of seeding barren worlds with food yeast which they used to feed their slaves. Over a billion years, the Thrintun food yeast evolved into the different life forms in Known Space.

== In-universe terms ==
=== Belters ===
A Belter is a resident of the Asteroid Belt around Sol, sometimes known as the Sol Belt to differentiate it from Alpha Centauri's Serpent Swarm.

Rugged and highly individualistic, Belters make their living by mining the ores from the asteroidal rocks. Belters inhabit the main belt, trojan asteroids of the outer planets, centaur planetoids and NEA's.

Transient by nature, the only home they typically own is their pressure suit, and perhaps their singleship. As a form of heraldry, Belters decorate their skintight suits with elaborate (and often expensive) torso paintings. Most Belters, male and female, sport what is known as the Belter Crest: shaving their heads on the sides, leaving a strip of hair down the center resembling a mohawk. However, the hair in the back can be of any length, particularly for women.

In lieu of (or perhaps in addition to) a wake for their dead, Belters have a custom known as the ceremonial drunk. When a Belter dies, his or her close friends will typically get intoxicated (either alone or in groups according to one's nature or circumstance) and reminisce about the deceased.

The Belt Government collects a 30% tax on all cargo sold within the belt. However, one can avoid paying the tax by smuggling one's cargo to an Earth facility, which collects no taxes. The caveat is that, if one is caught smuggling by the Belt police (known as goldskins due to the color of their spacesuits), one will forfeit all of one's cargo to the Belt Government. To a Belter, smuggling is considered "illegal but not immoral". It is considered equivalent to a parking violation on Earth. If caught, one simply pays the fine and that is the end of it.

According to the novel Protector, the Belt government is a meritocracy; Lit Shaeffer was chosen for a leadership position by aptitude test, and "worked [his] way up".

=== Flatlanders ===
Flatlander refers to any human born on Earth, in contrast to those who live on other planets or space habitats. The derogatory term was coined by Belters, whose space habitats are either enclosed, or located on large asteroids with visibly curving horizons, whereas from any point on the surface of Earth the horizon looks flat.

Of the stable population of approximately eighteen billion people living on Earth from about the 23rd century onwards, very few wind up leaving the planet for any length of time. Many suffer from the so-called flatland phobia, a chronic fear of leaving the confines of the environment in which humans evolved. Their reaction to changes in gravity, atmospheric composition, and sunlight hue can include nausea and continual panic attacks.

Those who do venture into space, of course, tend to take exception to the word, as they have left the planet with no ill effects, and even relish partaking of the same adventures and benefits of space travel that non-Earthbound humans enjoy. Gregory Pelton is one of these, goading Beowulf Shaeffer into calling him a flatlander even after Pelton had traveled to a number of planets in Known Space.
