= Flatlander (short story) =

- Short story by Larry Niven
- Country: United States
- Language: English
- Genre: Science fiction

Publication
- Published in: Worlds of If
- Publication type: Monthly
- Publisher: Quinn Publications
- Published in English: March 1967

Chronology
- Series: Known Space
At the Core	Grendel

"Flatlander" is an English language science fiction short story by American writer Larry Niven, published in 1967. It is the third in the series of Known Space stories featuring crashlander Beowulf Shaeffer. The short story was originally published in Worlds of If, March 1967, and reprinted in Neutron Star, and Crashlander.

== Plot summary ==
Traveling to Earth after his trip to the core of the Milky Way Galaxy, Beowulf "Bey" Shaeffer befriends Gregory Pelton, a fabulously wealthy and gregarious flatlander (Earth-born human) who calls himself Elephant. Irritated at always being labeled a flatlander despite having logged many hours in space, Elephant decides to visit the most unusual system in or near Known Space and has his agents put in a call to meet with the nearest Outsider vessel. Elephant, as well as two women named Diana and Sharrol, show Shaeffer around Earth for a few days; Shaeffer and Sharrol quickly develop a romantic relationship.

Four days after landing on Earth, Elephant and Shaeffer travel to the edge of Known Space in Elephant's ship, the Slower Than Infinity (written ST∞), to meet the Outsiders for information on the location of the most unusual system in Known Space. The Outsiders charge a million "stars" (the interstellar currency) for the whereabouts of the system and Elephant accepts; the Outsiders also offer to explain, for an additional two hundred thousand stars, what exactly makes the star system unusual. Elephant declines when they reveal that he will be able to find this out for himself.

The Outsiders ferry the Slower Than Infinity to the system. The two make a list of particularities apparent about the planet orbiting what Shaeffer dubs the Fast Protosun:

- Velocity of the system relative to Known Space, 0.8 c .
- Possible extragalactic origin.
- Only protostar in Known Space.
- Extremely high radiation levels, which would result in their suit shielding breaking down in 3 days, the extension bubble in 20 hours.
- Very smooth surface of the planet, as if polished.
- The system is relatively clear of meteors.
- Protosun too thin for fusion, yet glowing.
- The planet has no lithosphere, it appears to be worn down to the asthenosphere which has hardened in the interstellar cold.
- An asteroid crater was nearly eroded away from interstellar dust, which should be too thin to work so fast.
- There are helium II lifeforms present on the planet.
- The lifeforms are all on the back side of the planet relative to its course through Known Space, as if they feared the interstellar dust.
- The so-called "indestructible" General Products hull evaporates while within its vicinity.

When the hull vanishes, they only have just enough time to get their helmets on. The remainder of the ship, along with the stowed extension bubble, is still intact. Elephant insists on attempting to land on the planet anyway, but Shaeffer refuses, unless Pelton can explain why the General Products hull disappeared, and demands they run for it. Elephant agrees resentfully, but says that if he were alone he would go down, and declares his intention to come back on his own.

With some difficulty, they return to Jinx. Shaeffer contacts with a General Products Puppeteer, declaring that his GP hull failed. He gives the Puppeteer details about the circumstances and the Puppeteer agrees to pay the indemnity, noting that they were unaware that such large quantities of antimatter were present anywhere in the galaxy. This is what caused the hull to disintegrate.

It is thus revealed to Shaeffer and Elephant that what made the system the most distinctive was its composition: antimatter. Elephant finally understands why he is just a "flatlander": He does not instinctively recognize that the universe is a dangerous place to live in.

== See also ==
- "Neutron Star", the first story in the Beowulf Shaeffer series
- "At the Core", the second story in the series
- "Grendel", the fourth story in the series
- "The Borderland of Sol", the fifth story in the series
- "Procrustes", the sixth story in the series
- "Ghost", the framing story in the collection Crashlander
- "Fly-by-Night", the seventh story in the series, written after Crashlander
- "The Soft Weapon" indirectly referenced via first suggested name, "Cue Ball", implying timeline but since retconned to many years after the events of this story.
- "Juggler of Worlds" provides another, somewhat third-hand viewpoint of the events of this story.
