= Barlowe's Guide to Extraterrestrials =

1979 book by Wayne Barlowe

- Cover of the first edition
- Authors: Wayne Barlowe, Ian Summers, Beth Meacham
- Illustrator: Wayne Barlowe
- Cover artist: Wayne Barlowe
- Language: English
- Genre: Science fiction
- Publisher: Workman Publishing Company
- Publication date: 1979
- Publication place: United States
- Media type: Print (Hardcover and Paperback)
- Pages: 144
- ISBN: 978-0894805004
- OCLC: 5491785
- LC Class: NC975.5.B36A4

Barlowe's Guide to Extraterrestrials (1979; second edition 1987) is a science fiction-themed book by artist Wayne Barlowe, with Ian Summers and Beth Meacham (who provided the text). It contains Barlowe's visualizations of different extraterrestrial life forms from various works of science fiction, with information on their planetary location or range, biology, and behaviors, in the style of a real field guide for animals. It was nominated for an American Book Award and for the 1980 Hugo Award for Best Related Work.

After the success of the work, in 1996 Barlowe and Neil Duskis wrote a second book, Barlowe's Guide to Fantasy.

== Summary ==
The book contains descriptions of the following species:

Alien	Author	Work
Abyormenite	Hal Clement	Cycle of Fire (1957)
Athshean	Ursula K. Le Guin	The Word for World Is Forest (1975)
Black Cloud	Fred Hoyle	The Black Cloud (1957)
Chulpex	Avram Davidson	Masters of the Maze (1965)
Cinruss	James White	Hospital Station (1962) and Star Surgeon (1963)
Cryer	Joseph Green	Conscience Interplanetary (1972)
Cygnan	Donald Moffitt	The Jupiter Theft (1977)
Cygnostik	Michael Bishop	A Little Knowledge (1977)
Czill	Jack L. Chalker	Midnight at the Well of Souls (1977)
Demon	Keith Laumer	A Plague of Demons (1965)
Demu	F. M. Busby	Cage a Man (1973)
Dextran	David J. Lake	The Right Hand of Dextra (1977)
Dilbian	Gordon R. Dickson	Spacial Delivery and Spacepaw (1961)
Dirdir	Jack Vance	The Dirdir (1969)
Garnishee	Harry Harrison	Star Smashers of the Galaxy Rangers (1973)
Gowachin	Frank Herbert	The Dosadi Experiment (1977)
Guild Steersman	Frank Herbert	Dune Messiah (1965)
Ishtarians	Poul Anderson	Fire Time (1974)
Ixchel	Madeleine L'Engle	A Wrinkle in Time (1962)
Ixtl	A. E. van Vogt	The Voyage of the Space Beagle (1950)
Lithian	James Blish	A Case of Conscience (1958)
Masters	John Christopher	The Tripods trilogy (1967, 1968)
Medusan	Jack Williamson	The Legion of Space (1947)
Merseian	Poul Anderson	Ensign Flandry (1966)
Mesklinite	Hal Clement	Mission of Gravity (1954)
Mother	Philip José Farmer	Strange Relations (1960)
Old Galactic	James H. Schmitz	Legacy (1979)
Old One	H. P. Lovecraft	At the Mountains of Madness (1936)
Overlord	Arthur C. Clarke	Childhood's End (1953)
Pnume	Jack Vance	The Pnume (1970)
Polarian	Piers Anthony	Cluster (1977)
Pierson's Puppeteers	Larry Niven	Neutron Star (1968) and Ringworld (1970)
Radiate	Naomi Mitchison	Memoirs of a Spacewoman (1962)
Regul	C. J. Cherryh	The Faded Sun: Kesrith (1978)
Riim	A. E. van Vogt	The Voyage of the Space Beagle (1950)
Ruml	Gordon R. Dickson	The Alien Way (1965)
Salaman	Brian Stableford	Wildeblood's Empire (1977)
Sirian	Frederik Pohl	The Age of the Pussyfoot (1969)
Slash	Piers Anthony	Kirlian Quest (1978)
Soft One	Isaac Asimov	The Gods Themselves (1972)
Solaris	Stanisław Lem	Solaris (1961)
Sulidor (Note: Alternately spelled 'Sulidoror' by both Barlowe and Silverberg)	Robert Silverberg	Downward to the Earth (1970)
Terran (human)		no specific novel — an image of a human (the author) used in the size comparison chart in the book.
The Thing	John W. Campbell	Who Goes There? (1938)
Thrint	Larry Niven	World of Ptavvs (1966)
Tran	Alan Dean Foster	Icerigger (1974)
Triped	Damon Knight	Rule Golden (1954)
Tyreean	James Tiptree	Up the Walls of the World (1978)
Uchjinian	Jack L. Chalker	Exiles at the Well of Souls series (1978)
Vegan	Robert A. Heinlein	Have Space Suit—Will Travel (1958)
Velantian	E. E. Smith	Children of the Lens (1954)
