= Kzin =

Fictional alien ethnic group

Kzinti on the cover of Man-Kzin Wars III.

The Kzinti (singular: Kzin) are an alien cat-like species developed by Larry Niven in his Known Space series.

The Kzinti were initially introduced in Niven's story "The Warriors" (originally in Worlds of If (1966), collected in Tales of Known Space (1975)) and "The Soft Weapon" (1967), collected in Neutron Star (1968). A Kzin character, Speaker-to-Animals (later known as Chmeee), subsequently played a significant role in Niven's Hugo and Nebula award-winning Ringworld (1970) and Ringworld Engineers (1980), giving considerably more background on the Kzinti and their interactions with human civilizations. Following Ringworld, Niven permitted several friends to write stories taking place in the time following "The Warriors" but before "The Soft Weapon"; These stories (including a handful by Niven) were collected in some volumes of The Man-Kzin Wars, which eventually reached fourteen volumes, the first published in June 1988. Kzinti also appears in Juggler of Worlds (2008) and Fate of Worlds (2012), novels within the Fleet of Worlds series (cowritten with Edward M. Lerner).

The Kzinti were also written by Niven into the Star Trek universe, appearing first in Star Trek: The Animated Series. Similar characters also appeared in Star Trek: Lower Decks and in Star Fleet Universe, as well as material for Star Trek: Enterprise that was never produced because of the series' cancellation.

== Background and history ==
Kzinti evolved from a plains-hunting felid, on a planet slightly colder and drier than Earth. The Kzin word for their home planet translates as Homeworld, often known as Kzinhome, among the Kzinti themselves. It is the third planet orbiting the star 61 Ursae Majoris.

The Kzin civilization was at an iron-age technological level, when an alien race called the Jotoki landed, and made stealthy first contact with a tribe of primitive hunter/gatherer Kzinti: they were interstellar merchants, looking for a species they could use as mercenaries.

Once the Jotok had taught the Kzinti how to use high-tech weapons, and other devices (including spacecraft), the Kzin rebelled, and made their former masters into slaves -- as well as the occasional meal. The crest of the Riit (Royal) family appears to be a bite mark -- though it is in fact a dentate leaf, with the words "From mercenary to master.", written around it in Kzinti script.

Kzin society is male-dominated. The leader of the race is called the Patriarch, and it is a hereditary title. The Kzinti call themselves "heroes" or the "Hero Race", and their society places a high value on "acting Heroic" and behaving in a heroic fashion.

To Kzin society, "heroic" means being honorable, and having integrity. Kzin honor, called strakh, is similar in many ways to the samurai code of Bushido. Strakh serves as almost a sort of currency or favor system, since their culture has no analog for money. For example, if the Patriarch gets meat from a seller's market stand, the seller gains considerable strakh, which will bring honor to the seller, aiding him to attract better customers, gaining strakh, i.e. higher status within the community.

Once Kzinti gained access to genetic-manipulation technology, they used it to reinforce and intensify their species' most "heroic" qualities and reduce the undesirable ones. To this end -- and because females are not valued except as bearers of children -- the male-dominated Kzin society bred (most of) their own females into sub-sapience.

Kzinti are often described as "anthropomorphic tigers," but there are significant, and visible, differences. Kzinti are larger than humans, standing around 8 feet (2.4 m) tall, and weighing around 500 pounds (230 kg). These tiger-sized bipeds have large and membranous ears, a barrel-chested torso, with a flexible spine, and large fangs and claws. One human gave an apt description of Kzin as "eight feet of death."

Unlike some popularly depicted anthropomorphic animals, Kzinti stand on two legs as do humans; they lack digitigrade ("backward-bending") legs. Hands have three fingers and an opposable thumb, each with a retractable claw.

Kzinti are covered with a thick coat of long fur, which comes in various combinations of orange, yellow, and black. (Full black coats are rare.) Their tails are naked, and similar in appearance to a rat's tail; their noses are black. Kzinti ears have fur, but only on the outside of the ear, and only about halfway up the ear itself, usually appear pink, and are shaped like a segment of a Chinese parasol (or cocktail umbrella; they are also sometimes described as "bat-winged"). They can fold back flat against the head for protection during a fight.

Kzinti speak in a hissing language they call the Hero's Tongue, which in its written form resembles commas and periods.

Kzinti cubs are tested by the Black Priests. Females are tested for intelligence; those who fail their tests by revealing too much intelligence are killed. Males are tested for telepathy; the ones who exhibit telepathic ability are forced into addiction of a drug derived from the lymph of an animal called a sthondat, which significantly increases telepathic ability. However, it is addictive and toxic, with long-term use, causing muscle atrophy, and thinning fur. The black-fur gene and the telepath gene are mutually exclusive; no completely black-furred Kzin is telepathic. All such cubs are taken by the Black Priests and raised within their cult.

Telepaths are tolerated by the warrior class, due to the specialized use of their skill; otherwise, they endure a low-caste position in society, just above the status of slaves; a slave is occasionally considered of a higher social status. Telepaths rarely, if ever, earn a name, and they are legally forbidden to breed.

Most Kzin females (s. Kzinrret, pl. Kzinrretti) are sub-sapient, with a vocabulary of fewer than a hundred word/sounds, and primarily instinct-driven behavior, and are treated as chattel by males. (s. Kzintosh, pl. Kzintoshi) This was not always the case: archaic Kzinrretti were sapient, until the Kzin used Jotoki biotechnology to reduce them to their current state, and also boosted the martial prowess in the males. Kzin society explains this, by stating that the (perhaps male?) Fanged God removed the Kzinrretti souls, as punishment for an attempted rebellion against him, shortly after he created the Kzinti. Nevertheless, even by the period of the novels, certain bloodlines still produce sentient females (as do some, if not most, primitive tribes). These tribes, long isolated from the patriarchy, avoided genetic modifications; at least two sentient females exist on Wunderland, and a population also exist on the Ringworld.

In the Known Space universe, the Kzinti are the first ongoing alien contact that humanity has met. The first contact with humanity ends the human golden era of peace -- where even history has been rewritten with a non-violent whitewash; organized violence was virtually eliminated, being reduced to roughly 1 in 1000 people, and interpersonal violence was unknown, except for occasional outbursts in the asteroid belt, where both medical and psychological care were thinly spread.

== Naming convention ==
Kzintoshi are born without names, which they must earn through valorous deeds. They are originally known by their relation to their father when they are kittens. After maturity, they are known by their rank or occupation. A Kzin who has performed a great deed will be granted a partial name by a superior; a further, greater deed earns a full name, the second of which is the family name.

In rare instances, a sufficiently illustrious accomplishment will earn a nameless one a full name in one fell swoop. An example of this is the granting of a full name to Trainer-of-Slaves, who single-handedly delivered a fully working hyperdrive to the Patriarchy in the novella "The Heroic Myth of Lieutenant Nora Argamentine" by Donald Kingsbury (appearing in Man-Kzin Wars VI (1994)), thus earning the full name Graaf-Nig.

An exception to this rule seems to accrue to the members of the Riit family, who have held the office of Kzinti Patriarch for uncounted generations. These appear to earn names upon reaching adulthood. However, in the 2006 novel Destiny's Forge by author Paul Chafe, the heir apparent to the Riit throne, "Pouncer", does not receive a name until it is earned by deed. (Under normal circumstances Pouncer would have received his Name automatically; however, in his position after the death of his father, earning his Name traditionally was essential to establishing his strakh as the heir to the Patriarchy.)

Only those Heroes who have earned a full name are allowed to breed. There seem to be exceptions to this, such as the reference made to Kzaargh-Commodore's harem in the novella "Catspaws" by Hal Colebatch (appearing in Man-Kzin Wars XI, 2005) despite his not having yet earned a full name.

An example of a Kzin's naming transition would be:

- Birth description: Third-Son of Khral-Hrag
- Occupation description: Weapons-Technician
- Partial name: Frep-Technician
- Full name: Frep-Hrag

== The Man-Kzin Wars ==
In several different stories by other authors writing in the universe, we see references to a total of five Man-Kzin wars taking place. The net effect of these wars is summed up by a retrospective comment from Beowulf Schaeffer in the short story "Grendel": "The Kzinti aren't really a threat. They'll always attack before they're ready", because the more certain one's victory is before a fight begins, the less honor is to be had from it. With decreasingly impressive logistical and technological advantages, each Man-Kzin War results in the confiscation or liberation of one or more Kzinti colony planets by the humans. In this way, humanity contacts the Pierin and Kdatlyno, former slave species, and takes over worlds such as Canyon (formerly Warhead) and Fafnir (formerly Shasht). Several of the stories of the Man-Kzin Wars depict the nearest human colony at Alpha Centauri, called Wunderland, which was occupied by the Kzinti for over 50 years.

Eventually (in Ringworld), we learn that the Kzin reverses were deliberately engineered by the Pierson's puppeteers, who lured the Outsiders to We Made It in the first place. This allowed the mayor of We Made It to purchase a faster-than-Light drive on credit from the Outsiders. Once the humans had FTL warships, the Kzinti couldn't defeat the humans in space combat. The puppeteers had hoped that the culling of a quarter to a third of the more aggressive members of the Kzinti with every war would result in a more peaceful race, or at least one that was capable of coexisting with other species without instantly trying to kill and eat them. This shift in Kzin attitudes succeeded spectacularly, although the Kzinti themselves do not think very highly of the changes, nor of the price they paid to achieve them. In fact, a fringe faction of the Kzinti known as the Kdaptists, frustrated with the reversals their race had suffered against humanity, went so far as to adopt the human concept that God had created humanity (not the Kzinti) in His image, and that He favors and protects humans over other races.

As the puppeteers expected, a form of "natural" selection occurred, with the more mindlessly aggressive Kzinti dying in the wars with humans and the more moderate, intelligent, and cautious Kzinti surviving, presumably to think long and hard about the consequences of starting yet another pointless war. By the time the Kzinti attained the level of sophistication and foresight needed to win against humans, they no longer had the numbers or the drive to do so.

At one point, Louis Wu, while visiting the Kzin homeworld and given access to the Kzinti Patriarch's game preserve, was confronted by a young Kzin and his father. When the youngster asked, "Are they good to eat?", Louis Wu responded with a Kzin grin (baring of the teeth being a Kzin challenge to battle), and the older Kzin responded "NO". Wu muses that the Kzin have learned that it would be safer for the young Kzin to eat arsenic than a human being.

One of the reasons humanity is such a dangerous enemy is the psychological blind spot the Kzinti have toward human females. Since the Kzinti have bred intelligence out of their own females, an inexperienced Kzin is sometimes careless enough to leave human females to their own devices, usually with fatal results for that particular Kzin. It has been further described in the novels that a combat-trained human female is a hero's worst nightmare. The Kzinti term for any particularly competent human female soldier is "Manrret" (singular) or "Manrretti" (plural), so named out of a sense of gallows humor regarding lethal encounters with the same. From the Kzinti point of view a Manrret's stamina, speed, reflexes, pain tolerance, and reasoning capability (enhanced intuition by virtue of increased interconnectedness between the left and right halves of the human female brain) are far superior to a man's. This gives some Kzin reason for considering each of the genders of humanity to be a separate alien species.

On Wunderland, the leader of Kzin has developed a bond with a human female that only they understand.

== Kdaptist ==
The Kdaptists are a religious sect of the Kzin. Prior to contacting humans, the predatory Kzin had conquered every species they had encountered, but humans—who, at the time of first contact, were believed by the Kzin to be unarmed pacifists—have consistently defeated the Kzinti. This was baffling and humiliating to the Kzinti, whose own religion told them that they were the pinnacle of creation.

During the first Man-Kzin War, a fighter pilot named Kdapt-Captain was captured by the Catskinner, an artificial intelligence sent by the Terrans to the Alpha Centauri system. Kdapt-Captain was kept in near-total sensory deprivation, except for the smell of his dead and rotting shipmates. He suffered from dehydration and starvation for several days, and when he was finally rescued (by humans), claimed to have seen God.

Changing his name to Kdapt-Preacher, he settled on Wunderland and lived as a hermit, telling whomever he met that God made Man, not Kzin, in his own image. He began wearing a mask of human skin during his prayers, so that God might think he was one of His human children.

By the time of the events in Ringworld, Kdaptism had become a minor, if not tolerated, religion. Speaker-to-Animals, when confronted, tells Louis Wu that he was raised by Kdaptists but that it 'didn't take'.

== Homeworld ==
Kzin
- Known Space location
- Created by: Larry Niven
- Genre: Science fiction

In-universe information
- Type: Planet
- Races: Kzinti, slave races
- Locations: Blood-of-Chwarambr City, Patriarch's Harem
- Characters: Kzinti Patriarch, Speaker-to-Animals, Chuut-Riit, Traat-Admiral, Kdapt-Preacher, Eater-of-Grass

The Kzin homeworld is called "Kzin" by all other races save the Kzinti, who call it "Homeworld" or "Kzinhome". It orbits the star 61 Ursae Majoris and has stronger surface gravity and both a longer day and year than Earth. The Patriarch rules from a large palace on the planet. At the end of the last Man-Kzin War, around 2618, Kzin was occupied and disarmed by human armies.

== Patriarch ==
The Kzinti Patriarch is the leader of the Kzin race. As with other facets of the Kzinti culture, natural selection is used to choose the Patriarch through combat. Throughout the range of the Known Space books, the patriarchy is held by the Riit family. The patriarch has a range of privileges, including a protected hunting reserve and the authority to assign full names to Kzin who have brought glory or honor to the Kzinti empire. There are in fact two Patriarchs as the smaller, lost colony of Kzinti on the Ringworld also has a patriarch in addition to the main Kzinti empire.

== In other science fiction ==
=== Star Trek ===
Kzinti
- Star Trek race
- Insignia of the Kzin Empire

In-universe information
- Home world: Kzin
- Capital: Kzin
- Base of operations: Patriarchy
- Leader: Patriarch

The Kzinti appeared, along with allusions to slavers and stasis boxes, in "The Slaver Weapon", an episode of Star Trek: The Animated Series adapted by Niven from his short story "The Soft Weapon". Star Trek: Enterprise producer Manny Coto wanted to include the Kzinti in an episode called "Kilkenny Cats", had the series continued beyond its fourth season. The Kzinti are also mentioned in dialog in the seventh episode of Star Trek: Picard.

The Kzinti were incorporated into the Star Fleet Universe where they control a powerful empire known as the Kzinti Hegemony, mortal enemies of that universe's Lyran Star Empire. It is alluded that the Kzinti and Lyrans share common ancestry, a claim both sides violently reject.

The Kzinti are also represented in the lore of the Star Fleet Battles universe tabletop gaming system, with a number of scenarios and starship sheets devoted to them.

The Star Trek Log series, written by Alan Dean Foster, hints that the Caitians are an offshoot race of archaic Kzinti (where both genders are intelligent) who have renounced conquest. According to a memory of Lieutenant M'Ress, the secondary communications officer in Star Trek Logs, the Caitian and Kzinti languages are similar enough that M'Ress can pass as a Kzin just long enough for her to send off a distress call from a Kzinti raiding ship.

The Kzinti reappear in the comic The Wristwatch Plantation, also by Niven (and which included the Bebebebeque from his Draco Tavern stories). Kzin appeared on a star map seen in several episodes of Star Trek: The Next Generation, and a triple-breasted feline stripper from Star Trek V: The Final Frontier was referred to backstage as a "Kzinrrett". The name of the Tzenkethi, mentioned in Star Trek: Deep Space Nine, was rumored to be an almost-anagram of "Kzinti".

The instruction manual for the PC game Star Trek: Starfleet Command clearly refers to the Kzinti by name in the background story for the rival race, the Lyrans. This race is introduced in Star Trek: Starfleet Command II: Empires at War by simply changing the Kzinti Hegemony to the Mirak Star League.

On May 17, 2012, the MMORPG Star Trek Online introduced the Ferasans as a playable race for the in-game Klingon Empire faction. The Ferasans were based upon the Kzinti from "The Slaver Weapon", but the alternate name "Ferasan" had to be chosen due to legal issues.

On March 6, 2020, the Kzinti were mentioned in the seventh episode of Star Trek: Picard, where William Riker mentions that they have been causing problems on the planet Nepenthe.

A Kzin crewman named Taylor appears in Star Trek: Lower Decks as a minor character in several episodes starting in Season 2. In the episode "The Spy Humungous", he briefly assumes a pose similar in appearance to the Kzinti design seen in The Animated Series before straightening his back into a proper humanoid posture, which he explained as essential to maintaining a commanding presence.

=== Star Fleet Universe ===
Kzinti Hegemony

In-universe information
- Type: Feudal monarchy led by the Patriarch
- Races: Kzintis, (formerly) Cygnans
- Locations: Capital:' Kzintai
- Neighboring powers: (Carnivons), Lyrans, WYN, Klingons, Federation
- Affiliation: Alliance
- Major enemies: Lyrans (Y48+); Klingons (Y50+); Carnivons (Y55–Y106); Federation (Y88 – c.Y160); Romulans (Y173–Y185); Seltorians (Y182–Y185); Andromedans (Y190-Y203)
- Known Allies: Hydrans (Unk+); Federation (Y160+); Gorn (Y174+); Tholians (Y177–Y185)

The Kzintis in the SFU, who have traits setting them apart (e.g., no bat ears, sentient females, Kzinti/Kzintis as singular/plural) from the Kzinti of Niven's works, have fought wars with all of their neighbors: the Federation, the Klingon Empire, and their perennial nemesis, the Lyran Star Empire, and are long-standing allies – or more accurately, co-belligerents – of the Hydran Kingdom. The Hegemony eventually formed a tentative accord with the Federation and allied with them in the General War, but they have been involved in major wars with the Klingons and Lyrans, such as the Four Powers War and the General War itself, in which a substantial region of their territory was occupied by their Coalition enemies and two full-scale assaults were made on the Kzinti homeworld of Kzintai. Eventually, with Federation assistance, they forced the Coalition forces from their territory, but after the war ended, they were involved in a civil war as a disgruntled faction, which had been opposed to the Hegemony's ruling Patriarch and sought refuge and developed a power base in the WYN Cluster, launched an attempted coup of the Hegemony itself in the WYN War of Return.

In the fictional variant of the Star Fleet Universe as represented in the games Star Trek: Starfleet Command II: Empires at War and Star Trek: Starfleet Command: Orion Pirates from Taldren, the Kzintis were renamed as the Mirak.
