= The Patchwork Girl =

1980 science fiction novel by Larry Niven

- First edition
- Author: Larry Niven
- Illustrator: Fernando Fernandez
- Language: English
- Series: Known Space
- Release number: 4
- Genre: Detective fiction; Science fiction
- Publisher: Ace Books
- Publication date: 1980
- Publication place: United States
- Media type: Print
- Pages: 205
- ISBN: 0441653162
- OCLC: 7024968

The Patchwork Girl is a science fiction mystery novel by American writer Larry Niven. Part of his Known Space series, it is the fourth of five Gil Hamilton detective stories and the first to be published as a stand-alone novel in 1980. It was later included in the Gil Hamilton anthology Flatlander.

In a break from his usual ARM duties, Hamilton is an acting U.N. Delegate on the moon, attending a conference on Lunar Law. The Belt Delegate, Chris Penzler, is shot by a laser in an apparent murder attempt. The shot came from outside of the window of his personal quarters, which looks out onto the lunar surface. The only person known to be outside on the lunar surface at the time of the attempt is Naomi Mitchison, a tourist and old flame of Gil's.

Gil believes Naomi to be innocent of shooting Penzler, but suspects that she may be lying in order to hide an equally serious crime. The legal process on Luna acts quickly, and Naomi is condemned to be "broken up" for spare parts, a process which involves her being put in a coma and used as a source of organs for transplant. In stories set in this era, the need for spare parts is so great that even minor crimes carry this sentence. Gil uses his ARM authority to investigate, taking advantage of his "phantom arm", his ability to sense things remotely that he gained after losing one arm in an accident when he lived among the Belters. Although the sense is limited by his perception of his arm's reach, he discovers it can be amplified by a 3-D projection of the lunar surface. Feeling around the projection, he is able to detect a clue left out on the surface by the actual criminal. When he finally solves the mystery, Naomi is revived, but with her beauty destroyed by having body parts removed and then replaced. Her real crime is revealed as one that violates the strict population laws of Earth, and she has to leave and live elsewhere in the Solar System.

== References to other works, people ==
"Naomi Mitchison" was the name of a Scottish writer and poet. It is not known if Niven chose the name knowing this.
