= Crashlander =

1994 novel by Larry Niven

- First edition (publ. by Del Rey Books); Cover art by Don Dixon
- Author: Larry Niven
- Publisher: Del Rey Books
- Publication date: March 2, 1994
- ISBN: 978-0-345-38168-2

Crashlander is a fix-up novel by American writer Larry Niven, published in 1994 (ISBN 978-0345381682) and set in his Known Space universe. It is also a term used in the Known Space universe, denoting a human born on the planet We Made It.

== Plot summary ==
Crashlander brings together the short stories featuring the space pilot Beowulf Shaeffer — "Neutron Star" (1966), "At the Core" (1966), "Flatlander" (1967), "Grendel" (1968), "The Borderland of Sol" (1975), and "Procrustes" (1993).

The stories are linked, and some of them extended, by a framing story, "Ghost". This story recounts Shaeffer's reunion with a ghostwriter whom Shaeffer had used to write about his adventures at the neutron star and at the core, Ander Smittarasheed. Ander, working for ARM agent Sigmund Ausfaller, has come to question him about his dealings with Pierson's Puppeteers, General Products and Carlos Wu, as well as what happened to Wu and ARM agent Feather Filip. Wu, Shaeffer and Sharrol Janss and their children, Tanya and Louis Wu, had secretly emigrated from Earth to the planet Fafnir to escape the control of Earth's United Nations government and the ARM.

"Neutron Star", "At The Core", "Flatlander"', and "Grendel" were previously included in the 1968 collection Neutron Star.

Most of the stories in the collection are retold from the point of view of Sigmund Ausfaller in Juggler of Worlds.

== Crashlander (in-universe term) ==
A "Crashlander", in Known Space, is anyone from the planet We Made It. As the names imply, the colonists who first settled the planet almost did not survive the landing.

== See also ==
- Flatlander (in-universe term)
- Belter (in-universe term)
