= 61 Ursae Majoris =

Star in the Ursa Major constellation

- Location of 61 Ursae Majoris (circled in red)

Observation data Epoch J2000 Equinox ICRS
- Constellation: Ursa Major
- Right ascension: 11^{h} 41^{m} 03.01594^{s}
- Declination: +34° 12′ 05.8824″
- Apparent magnitude (V): 5.35

Characteristics
- Evolutionary stage: Main sequence
- Spectral type: G8V
- U−B color index: +0.27
- B−V color index: +0.69
- Variable type: Suspected

Astrometry
Radial velocity (R_{v})	−5.18±0.08 km/s
Proper motion (μ)	RA: −12.247 mas/yr Dec.: −381.257 mas/yr
Parallax (π)	104.3904±0.1287 mas
Distance	31.24 ± 0.04 ly (9.58 ± 0.01 pc)
Absolute magnitude (M_{V})	5.53±0.006

Details
Mass	0.94±0.06 M_{☉}
Radius	0.845±0.015 R_{☉}
Luminosity	0.588±0.007 L_{☉}
Surface gravity (log g)	4.52±0.08 cgs
Temperature	5,488±44 K
Metallicity [Fe/H]	−0.03±0.03 dex
Rotation	17.1 days
Rotational velocity (v sin i)	3.3 km/s
Age	1.4±0.2 Gyr

Other designations
- 61 UMa, NSV 5291, BD+35°2270, FK5 1300, GJ 434, HD 101501, HIP 56997, HR 4496, SAO 62655, WDS J11411+3412A, LTT 13200

Database references
SIMBAD	data

61 Ursae Majoris, abbreviated 61 UMa, is a single star in the northern circumpolar constellation of Ursa Major. It has a yellow-orange hue and is dimly visible to the naked eye with an apparent visual magnitude of 5.35. The distance to this star is 31.2 light years based on parallax, and it is drifting closer with a radial velocity of −5.2 km/s. The star has a relatively high proper motion traversing the sky at the rate of 0.381″ yr^{−1}.

The stellar classification of 61 UMa is G8V, matching a late G-type main-sequence star. Since 1943, the spectrum of this star has served as one of the stable anchor points by which other stars are classified. It is considered a solar-type star, having physical properties that make it similar to the Sun. The star has 93% of the mass of the Sun and 86% of the Sun's radius. It is roughly two billion years old and is spinning with a projected rotational velocity of 3.3 km/s, for a period of 17.1 days. The metallicity, or abundance of elements with higher atomic number than helium, appears about the same as in the Sun. The star is radiating 61% of the luminosity of the Sun from its photosphere at an effective temperature of 5,488K.

During the 1950s, Karl Pilowski reported that photographic plates taken of the star appeared to show a variability of 0.2 in magnitude. Follow-up studies initially failed to confirm this variability, and it was found not to be an eclipsing binary based on radial velocity measurements. The star's photosphere is rotating differentially, and the rotation period, typically in the range of 16–18 days, shows a larger difference between different latitudes than for most other stars. It has an active chromosphere that exhibits strong and persistent starspot activity. A flare event was captured in 2013 while the star was being observed by the VATT, and the star has been detected as a source of X-ray emission.

No substellar companions have been observed in orbit around this star, and it appears to lack a dust ring as is found around some comparable stars. A radial velocity survey completed in 2020 has indicated that giant planetary companions are absent. A magnitude 11.35 stellar visual companion was reported by O. Struve in 1850. As of 2015, this star was located at an angular separation of 158.90″ from the brighter star, along a position angle of 86°.

== In popular culture ==
In the science fiction of Larry Niven's Known Space universe, the homeworld of the major race the Kzinti is the third planet in orbit around 61 Ursae Majoris.
