= Pierson's Puppeteers =

Fictional species

Pierson's Puppeteers, often known just as Puppeteers, are a fictional alien race from American author Larry Niven's Known Space books. The race first appeared in Niven's novella Neutron Star.

Illustration of Pierson's Puppeteer from Barlowe's Guide to Extraterrestrials

== Biology and sociology ==
The sobriquet "Pierson's" comes from the name of the human who made first contact in the early 26th century in the Known Space timeline. According to the Niven story The Soft Weapon, Pierson was a crewman aboard a spaceship at a time when there was a camp revival of the ancient Time for Beany TV show featuring Cecil the Seasick Sea Serpent, an animated character based on a hand puppet; Pierson accordingly described the alien he had met as a Puppeteer, given some resemblance of the head and neck with Cecil. Puppeteers dealing with humans usually give themselves the names of centaurs and other figures in Greek mythology, such as Nessus, Nike and Chiron. Puppeteers' names for themselves are reportedly highly complex, and unpronounceable by humans. The group name they use for their own species translates as "Citizens".

Pierson's Puppeteers are described by Niven as having two forelegs and a single hindleg ending in hoofed feet, and two snake-like heads instead of a humanoid upper body. The heads are small, containing a forked tongue, rubbery lips rimmed with finger-like knobs, and a single eye per head. The Puppeteer brain is housed not in the heads, but in the "thoracic" cavity well protected beneath the mane-covered hump from which the heads emerge. They use the "mouths" to manipulate objects, as a humanoid uses hands.

The Puppeteer's native language sounds like highly complex orchestral music, but they seem to be able to reproduce human language without difficulty or device, as well as the Heroes' Tongue (Kzinti), suggesting their vocal arrangement may resemble a pair of avian-like syrinxes rather than vocal cords.

Biologically, Puppeteers are highly intelligent herbivores; a herd animal, Puppeteers prefer the company (and smell) of their own kind. Their cycle of reproduction is similar to that of Earth's digger wasps: the Puppeteers consider themselves to have three genders (two male, one female): the two "male" genders are the equivalent of human female and male (one has an ovipositor, the other produces sperm) and the "female" is a (non-sentient) parasitized host into which the ovum and spermatozoon are deposited.

Puppeteers are very long-lived. The exact length of a Puppeteer's lifespan is unknown, but it is at least several centuries—Nessus, the most prominent individual Puppeteer in the works, is over 300 years old during the events of the original Ringworld novel. This, together with a total lack of contraceptives (except major surgery) for their species along with an unwillingness to use them, is responsible for extreme crowding: the Puppeteer homeworld has a population of over a trillion, and four farming worlds are dedicated entirely to supplying the population with food. Even then, grown food is a luxury reserved for only the highest-ranking, with synthesizers feeding the vast majority. While contraception is forbidden, access to 'brides' (the parasitized breeding host, the third 'sex') is strictly controlled. Puppeteers also have access to highly advanced medical technology that may be a factor in their longevity.

Technologically, the Puppeteers are very advanced, centuries or millennia ahead of most other species (including humans). For example, humans in Niven's universe invented (actually purchased from the Puppeteers) a method of cheap teleportation in the twenty-fifth century called a transfer booth, which requires an enclosed space at either end of the transmission. Puppeteers use a much more elegant and sophisticated booth-less "open" version in the form of stepping disks, which require no enclosure. They transformed their home world, and several other astronomical bodies, into a Klemperer rosette, in order to flee a galactic catastrophe.

Puppeteers appear to lack generalized empathy towards other intelligent species and display almost textbook sociopathic tendencies: they are highly manipulative, appearing to feel no psychological distress when their actions cause harm to others, they perform interstellar-scale manipulation of other species, inducing and directing large scale wars in order to achieve the goal of their own safety and they do not appear to be disturbed when required to make choices that result in the deaths of billions or trillions. From what little interaction is shown between Puppeteers, it seems their lack of empathy extends to their own species. Mate selection seems to be largely status-based, with higher status mates being more desirable. The Puppeteer Nessus finds comfort in having his living space produce simulated proximity to his species: the smells, sounds, and sights of other Puppeteers. However, he appears to have little need or desire for social interaction with others of his kind.

Socially, two notable traits of Puppeteers are their racial/cultural penchant for cowardice and their tendency to congregate in herds. The cowardice is thought in Puppeteer society to originate with the Puppeteer instinct for turning one's back on danger. However, the trait is thought by many to actually originate from their herd instinct, as the instinct to turn one's back is linked to an instinct to kick the hind hoof at an attacker. In Ringworld, when Nessus and the expeditionaries are threatened, the Puppeteer defends himself quite effectively:

All in one motion, the puppeteer had spun on his forelegs and lashed out with his single hind leg. His heads were turned backwards and spread wide, Louis remembered, to triangulate on his target. Nessus had accurately kicked a man's heart out through his splintered spine. (Ringworld, Chapter 13, published 1970.)

Another behavioral trait is the coma state, broadly a cognate of the human fetal position–in the same way that ostriches are said to bury their heads in the sand, Puppeteers fold up into a ball, tucking their three legs and two heads underneath the padded cranial bulge. This is, in part, an explosion reflex, learned during childhood. Their cowardice is also reflected in their architecture and object design, as all the Puppeteer-designed rooms and vessels have no sharp edges, everything curves into everything else, giving a "half-melted" look and meaning that objects are less likely to damage someone inadvertently, through their own carelessness.

In Ringworld, Nessus, a Puppeteer, explains how his race's cowardice is partly a result of a science experiment (the details of which are not given) that proves the Puppeteers have nothing equivalent to an immortal soul, and therefore death is, for their species, eternal oblivion. As a result, the Puppeteer race is fanatically devoted to its own safety. It is worth noting that this explanation is a form of diplomatic, post hoc rationalizing, as their cowardice is a biologically ingrained trait and not actually a rational choice. It is diplomatic, in that it validates in other species what Puppeteers consider to be irrationally insane bravery, although it is doubtful that the Puppeteers genuinely accept other species' claims to having souls.

A courageous Puppeteer is regarded as insane by his species, and actually shows symptoms associated with human mental illness, such as bipolar disorder, clinical depression and so on. However, aside from the crew of the Explorer (in the novel Fleet of Worlds), no human has ever met a completely sane Puppeteer, as no sane Puppeteer would ever leave the safety of the Fleet of Worlds (see below).

On occasion a Puppeteer will express its amusement by facing its two heads towards each other, in effect, looking at itself. This is described by Niven to be the closest to laughter a Puppeteer comes.

== Politics and relations with other species ==
Politically, the Puppeteers have a form of democracy with two major parties: the Conservatives and the Experimentalists. The Conservatives have held power for a majority of Puppeteer history; Experimentalist regimes only take power when a crisis threatens the safety of the Puppeteer race, and action is considered less dangerous than inaction.

The leader of the Puppeteers is known as the Hindmost. Since Pierson's Puppeteers are foremost concerned with their own safety and the survival of their species, the most important Puppeteer is considered to be behind, or protected by, every other member of the species. It is a shortening from the more literal the one who leads from behind. A maddened, deposed Hindmost is responsible for Louis Wu's return to the Ringworld in the book The Ringworld Engineers.

=== General Products ===
The Puppeteers' renown for honesty in trading allowed the species to accumulate an expansive mercantile empire called General Products; since the human Bronze Age, the Puppeteers have ruled this empire including every race in the 60-LY sphere of Known Space. One of the most important items sold by General Products is the General Products Hull for spaceships. Such a hull is completely impervious to everything except antimatter (which is not highly advertised but covered by a company warranty); the hull is transparent to visible light which can be alleviated by polarization or complete opacity; tidal forces and extreme gravitational force will not affect the hull but can kill the occupants, unless nullified by variable cabin gravity. The hulls are advertised as being capable of flying through the upper atmosphere of a star unscathed, although the contents will be cooked; as a protection against this particular contingency, the Puppeteers also provide a stasis field.

Exposure to antimatter is the only known method for destroying a General Products hull until the 2007 novel Fleet of Worlds. In the story Flatlander, a GP Hull is exposed to a constant stream of diffuse antimatter during a visit to a star system with some exotic qualities. Whereas a conventional hull made of metal, for example, would simply have ablated under these conditions, the General Products hull instead simply unravelled. This was due to the fact that a GP Hull essentially consisted of a single incredibly large, highly complex molecule. Once a sufficient number of the atoms which constituted the molecule were annihilated by the antimatter, the molecule could not remain stable, and thus degenerated into a selection of less complex compounds and elements, effectively causing the hull to vanish in an instant. Fortunately, the vessel's pilot was sufficiently cautious to be wearing a vacuum suit at the time, and survived, as did the owner of the ship.

In Fleet of Worlds, the characters tour a General Product factory and ask innocent-seeming questions of their tour guide, Baedeker. Baedeker reveals (apparently unintentionally) that the manufacturing process is extremely sensitive to gravity and impurities, that the hulls are constructed from a single super-molecule using nanotech, and their strength is reinforced by an embedded power plant that reinforces the inter-atomic bonds. These facts provide the clues that allow them to later destroy a GP Hull from the inside and survive.

In Destroyer of Worlds, a captured Pak Protector analyzes the hull, deducing that it comprises a dynamically reinforced molecular structure and how to siphon energy from the structure.

=== Foreign policy ===
The general foreign policy of Puppeteers consists of attempts to control the universe around them to ensure their own safety. As Puppeteers try to expose themselves to as little risk as possible, they use other beings as agents whenever possible, utilizing a combination of bribes and blackmail to obtain cooperation. Blackmail is not immoral to Puppeteers, and they have an established code of conduct surrounding the practice, making it perfectly safe for both the blackmailer and the victim, including that the blackmailer must turn over all their evidence against the victim and submit to a partial memory wipe, so they cannot betray the blackmail deal. The Puppeteers also use more personal manipulation; for instance, Puppeteers who have dealt with human males have utilized a voice that sounds like that of a seductive human female, and the Puppeteer Nessus utilized an implanted tasp, a device which could stimulate the pleasure center of the brain, thus allowing him to subliminally condition those he dealt with.

In Ringworld, it is revealed that the Puppeteer government meddled in human and Kzinti gene pools. They started a series of wars (the Man–Kzin Wars) between the warlike Kzinti and humans, and guaranteed that the Kzinti lose each time, not least by using a starseed lure to guide an Outsider ship into human space, introducing faster-than-light travel to humanity. This was a mechanism to cause rapid Kzinti evolution, since the most aggressive Kzinti would die in battle, leaving the more docile individuals to breed, eventually reducing their racial instinct for aggression.

Another Puppeteer breeding experiment was the Lucky Human Project. The Puppeteer government concluded that humans' most notable quality was luck and decided to strengthen this trait. Manipulating politics on Earth, the Puppeteers caused 'Birth Lotteries' on Earth around 2650, granting the winners the right to have extra offspring (strict limits were placed on most people to avoid overcrowding). Teela Brown, who journeys to the Ringworld with Louis Wu, is a descendant of multiple generations of lottery winners. Her luck is highly selective, bending probability so that the outcome most beneficial to her or her descendants comes to pass, without regard to its effects on those around her, contrary to the interests of the rest of the Ringworld expedition on more than one occasion.

The Puppeteers also influenced species on the Ringworld. After discovering the Ringworld, the Puppeteers sent probes with fungi on board that destroys room-temperature superconductors, in an attempt to gain a tactical advantage over the Ringworld. These fungi cause all superconductors (with the exception of those buried in Scrith) to rust into powder. The lack of a suitable alternative superconductor causes the fall of advanced civilizations throughout the Ringworld.

== Homeworld—The Fleet of Worlds ==
The Fleet of Worlds is the home planets of the Pierson's Puppeteer race. They consist of the native homeworld, called "Hearth", and its five agricultural worlds, arranged in a 'Kemplerer rosette' (likely a misspelling of a Klemperer rosette) being moved in synchronicity with each other. The number of worlds has varied; at maximum (at the opening of the novel Fleet of Worlds) the Fleet comprised six worlds. By two Earth centuries later, in Niven's novel Ringworld, the Fleet contains five worlds.

The Puppeteers first moved their worlds into this formation when their home star turned into a red giant, using an inertialess, reactionless drive purchased at great price from the Outsiders. After the discovery that the core of the galaxy is exploding, the Puppeteers turned the fleet towards the Magellanic Clouds, gradually reaching a speed of 80% lightspeed. Although the Puppeteers have faster-than-light technology they prefer to travel at safer, sub-light speeds.

For centuries, the location of the Puppeteer homeworld was a great mystery. No entity in Known Space outside the Puppeteer race was aware of the location, despite extensive surveys, with the probable exception of Jinx-born pirate Captain Kidd. In the short story "A Relic of the Empire", he discovered the Puppeteer home system by accident, and returned in the ship Puppet Master to rob inbound Puppeteer vessels, rather than pursuing a formal blackmail arrangement. Kidd claimed the Puppeteers' home planet orbited a "red giant, undersized" star (known as "Giver Of Life"), in the vicinity of coordinates 23.6, 70.1, 6.0 (using an unnamed coordinate system). Before dying, he passed this location along to Richard Shultz-Mann, of the planet Wunderland.

Puppeteers were willing to pay large sums of hush money in order to suppress even trivial details about their homeworld. In 2641 AD, it was discovered that the Puppeteers' homeworld had no moon, information deduced as a result of the solving of the mystery of the deaths of a crew of a ship investigating a neutron star. The ship, based on a General Products hull, was impervious to tidal forces but the crew were not. Because the Puppeteers seemingly have no experience of tides, they were unable to anticipate the deadly tidal forces. (As told in Niven's short story, "Neutron Star".) Crashlander reveals that the Puppeteers may have feigned their ignorance of tidal forces.

The Puppeteers had to make some drastic alterations to their home system, during their history, as waste heat due to overindustrialisation was rapidly making their planet uninhabitable. They moved their home planet further from their sun, to lessen the effects of global warming, but overindustrialisation forced them to move five other planets closer to their world and xenoform them into "farming worlds", arranging all the planets into a 'Kemplerer rosette'. (Before Ringworld opens, one of the worlds has left the formation, as part of the central conflict in Niven and Edward M. Lerner's Fleet of Worlds.)

Nessus explains some of this background to Louis Wu and the crew of the Long Shot thus:

"I had explained," said Nessus, "that our civilization was dying in its own waste heat. Total conversion of energy had rid us of all waste products of civilization, save that one. We had no choice but to move our world outward from its primary."

"Was that not dangerous?"

"Very. There was much madness that year. For that reason it is famous in our history. But we had purchased a reactionless, inertialess drive from the Outsiders. You may have guessed their price. We are still paying in installments. We had moved two agricultural worlds; we had experimented with other, useless worlds of our system using the Outsider drive. In any case, we did it. We moved our world.

"In short, we found that a sun was a liability rather than an asset. We moved our world to a tenth of a light year's distance, keeping the primary only as an anchor. We needed the farming worlds and it would have been dangerous to let our world wander randomly through space. Otherwise we would not have needed a sun at all.

"We had brought suitable worlds from nearby systems, increasing our agricultural worlds to four, and setting them in a Kemplerer Rosette."

—Ringworld, Chapter 5, published 1970

Eventually, their sun converted from a yellow dwarf to a red giant, so the Puppeteers moved the "Fleet of Worlds", the five planets, to their system's Oort cloud. This is one of the reasons the Puppeteers were so successful at keeping the location of their homeworld a secret—explorers would be looking for a yellow dwarf (as one could surmise that Puppeteers had evolved around a yellow dwarf from their biology and that they were comfortable on Earth-like planets without pressure suits) when their planet(s) were actually near a red giant.

In the short story "At the Core", Beowulf Shaeffer, who made the discovery about tidal forces five years previously, in "Neutron Star", discovers that the Galactic Core is exploding. This news prompts the Puppeteer Exodus, where the Fleet of Worlds flees the galaxy at just under light speed for the Magellanic Clouds, in the hope that by the time the explosion reaches the Fleet of Worlds, the Puppeteers will have found a way to protect their civilization. This exodus prompts a major stock market crash in human society. In 2864, the Fleet of Worlds leaves Known Space.

Beowulf notes, however, that the speed at which the Fleet of Worlds is moving (0.8c) would cause nearly as much damage as the Core explosion itself. This suggests radiation may not be the primary danger the Puppeteers flee, also that Puppeteers may, in fact, have a means to deal with radiation affecting entire worlds. In Crashlander it is speculated that the Puppeteers are planning on moving to the now-uninhabited Core, isolated from potentially dangerous species - which would have either fled the galaxy entirely or been destroyed. Their initial path is revealed to be out of the plane of the galaxy, but no mention is made of Louis Wu noticing trajectory when flying there on the Long Shot in Ringworld.

== Appearances in Known Space works ==
=== Novels ===
In in-universe chronological order:

- Fleet of Worlds
- Juggler of Worlds
- Destroyer of Worlds
- Betrayer of Worlds
- Ringworld
- Ringworld Engineers
- The Ringworld Throne
- Ringworld's Children
- Fate of Worlds

== Appearances in other media ==
- Puppeteers were one of the species detailed in Barlowe's Guide to Extraterrestrials, by Wayne Barlowe.
- Puppeteers have appeared in several comics illustrated by John Byrne:
  - One of the Green Lanterns shown on the cover of the graphic novel Green Lantern: Ganthet's Tale, written by Larry Niven, is a Pierson's Puppeteer. It also appears in one panel of the comic itself.
  - A Puppeteer appears in the Marvel comic Uncanny X-Men #125, pg 16 (Popeye is also in the same panel).
  - A Puppeteer appears on one of the cover variants of the third issue of the Star Trek comic Leonard McCoy, Frontier Doctor, with a small text bubble stating "With thanks to Larry Niven for the loan!"
- In Niven's collaborative novel Fallen Angels, a science fiction fan has a life-sized model of a Puppeteer skeleton; to escape prosecution from religious authorities, he claims that it is really a model of a demon's skeleton.
- Although not identified as such, one of the aliens fought by Yuri in the manga Alien Nine appears to be a Puppeteer.

== External links and references ==
- I. Marc Carlson's Known Space timeline
- Brian O'Neill's Known Space encyclopedia
- Puppeteer Artwork
