= The Defenseless Dead =

1973 science fiction novella by Larry Niven

The Defenseless Dead is a science fiction novella by American writer Larry Niven, set in the Known Space universe. It is the second of five Gil Hamilton detective stories. It was published in 1973 in the Roger Elwood anthology Ten Tomorrows.

Science fiction philosopher Stephen R. L. Clark, in his work How to Live Forever (1995), mistakenly credits this story with inventing the term "corpsicle". The term had already appeared in Frederik Pohl's The Age of the Pussyfoot (1969), after an earlier spelling by Pohl was published in a 1966 Worlds of Tomorrow essay, "Immortality Through Freezing".

== Plot summary ==
In the story, Organlegging is rampant on Earth in the early 22nd century. In an attempt to alleviate the problem, the UN had passed the first "Freezer Law", declaring paupers in cryogenic suspension to be dead in law, allowing their organs to be harvested and made available for transplant. A few years later with the organ banks running low, the second "Freezer Law" is going through the legislative process, this time targeting the insane, some quite wealthy. This despite cures existing for most forms of insanity.

After a visit to the local cryogenic facility, Hamilton is finishing lunch with an acquaintance, when he is shot at in a seemingly random act by a local lunatic. Closer investigation reveals the attacker to be a former organlegger who retired after the first Freezer Bill went into law. The plot becomes more complicated with the involvement of a potential cryo-heir to a considerable fortune who had been kidnapped, along with his sister, and then released, though the sister was left in a state of catatonia that doctors cannot cure. The heir has minor personality changes, but was apparently not otherwise affected by their ordeal, though he claims to remember nothing of it.

Gil solves the case by deduction and also with his "phantom arm" that enables him to manipulate objects and sense things with an imaginary sense of touch, even through a 3D videophone connection. Although the heir looks the same, his body hosts the brain and spinal column of a top boss organlegger. The sister was subjected to weeks of electrical stimulation of her brain to turn her into a "wirehead" who cannot function without stimulation of the pleasure center. During Hamilton's lunch, the organlegger saw Hamilton looking at him and convinced himself that Hamilton knew his real identity. The attack was a response, but its failure caused Hamilton to investigate everyone in the restaurant instead.

With the apparent involvement of an organlegger in the second Freezer Bill, there are worldwide protests against it, and Hamilton and his boss speculate that the bill will be defeated.
