= Death by Ecstasy =

1969 novella by Larry Niven

First publication Cover art by Gray Morrow

Death by Ecstasy is a science fiction novella by American writer Larry Niven, set in the Known Space universe. It is the first of five Gil Hamilton detective stories, and provides most of the backstory for the character. It first appeared in the January 1969 edition of Galaxy under the title The Organleggers.

== Plot summary ==
A belter, Owen Jennison, is found dead on Earth in a locked Los Angeles apartment. His death is an apparent suicide. Hamilton, a friend and former crewmate of Jennison, is called to the scene to investigate. He finds Owen with a droud (a wirehead's transformer) plugged into the back of his head. The latter apparently starved himself to death while continuously stimulating the pleasure center of his own brain.

Hamilton, refusing to believe that his friend would commit suicide or turn wirehead, suspects foul play.

== Editions ==
- Spangler, Bill; Tidwell, Terry; Stiles, Steve (1991). Fiction. Malibu Graphics. p. 76. ISBN 978-1-56398-004-6.
- Spangler, Bill; Tidwell, Terry; Stiles, Steve (1991). Death by Ecstasy: Illustrated Adaptation of the Larry Niven Novella. Malibu Graphics.
