= Star Trek Log (book series) =

- Cover of Star Trek Log Ten (1978)
- Author: Alan Dean Foster
- Country: United States
- Language: English
- Genre: Science fiction
- Publisher: Ballantine Books
- Published: 1974–1978
- Media type: Print (Paperback)
- No. of books: 10

Star Trek Log is a series of ten novelizations based on, and inspired by, episodes of the science fiction television series Star Trek: The Animated Series. Published by Ballantine Books from 1974 to 1978, the series was written by Alan Dean Foster and edited by Judy-Lynn del Rey. The series is similar to novelizations based on episodes of Star Trek: The Original Series published by Bantam Books, written by James Blish and J. A. Lawrence.

== Production ==
After completing two novelizations for Ballantine Books, Luana (Note: Novelization of Italian film Luana la figlia delle foresta vergine (1968), directed by Roberto Infascelli.) (1974) and Dark Star (1974), Foster was approached by editor Judy-Lynn del Rey to adapt episodes of the Star Trek animated series to prose. Foster agreed, and was granted freedom to arrange the adaptations however he wished.

Foster was uncertain how to structure the series initially, but settled collating three episode scripts per book and linking them together into a cohesive story. Similar to a fix-up novel. Foster said, "I had pretty much a free hand. Hence the opportunity to insert little fun bits and pieces." The first volume, Log One, was released during the summer of 1974.

Sales of the first six volumes "skyrocketed", according to Foster. He was then approached by Del Ray to produce four more. Log Seven (1976) through Log Ten (1978) were based on one episode script each, which allowed Foster to greatly expand their stories.

=== Series name ===
Each volume carries the Star Trek Log title followed by a volume number, ex. Star Trek Log One. Foster named the books after the captain's log narration in each episode; referring to them as Star Trek "Logs" in Voyages of Imagination (2006). The titles were inspired by novelizations of Star Trek: The Original Series episodes written by James Blish, which were numbered instead of using episode names as titles. However, recent editions of Star Trek Log carry the Star Trek: The Animated Series title with Log One, etc. as a subtitle.

The name Star Trek Logs, plural, was adopted by contributors at Memory Alpha, and other fansites. Other sites, such as LibraryThing and the Internet Speculative Fiction Database, list the series as Star Trek Log, with each book given a corresponding volume number in the series.

== Reception ==
A blurb credited to Cecil Smith of the Los Angeles Times was printed on the cover of Log One (1974), it read: "NBC's new animated Star Trek is... fascinating fare, written, produced and executed with all the imaginative skill, the intellectual flare and the literary level that made Gene Roddenberry's famous old science-fiction epic the most avidly followed program in TV history..." In a review included in his Complete Starfleet Library web project, Steven Roby stated Foster carried the adaptations "into territory that might as well have been a different story altogether." The amount of material included by Foster was "enough to make these books seem almost more like original novels rather than simple adaptations."

Steve Lazarowitz of SF Site said in his review of Logs Seven and Eight (1996) that Foster, "did a great job of getting inside character's heads, as well as adding enough science and pseudoscience to make the stories plausible." For fans of the original series and animated series, Lazarowitz said in his review of Logs One and Two (1996) that the books were "must have."

Blogger Tracy Poff contrasted Foster's adaptation of "shorter episodes" from the animated series against James Blish's adaptations of longer episodes from the original series, saying "after reading ten volumes of Blish's spartan prose," Foster's prose was "refreshing."

Some volumes in the series received as many as twenty-four printings by Ballantine from 1974 to 1991.

== Volumes ==
| Title | Date | ISBN |
|---|---|---|
| Star Trek Log One | June 1974 | 0-345-24014-6 |
| Star Trek Log Two | September 1974 | 0-345-24184-3 |
| Star Trek Log Three | January 1975 | 0-345-24260-2 |
| Star Trek Log Four | May 1975 | 0-345-24435-4 |
| Star Trek Log Five | July 1975 | 0-345-24532-6 |
| Star Trek Log Six | May 1976 | 0-345-24655-1 |
| Star Trek Log Seven | June 1976 | 0-345-24965-8 |
| Star Trek Log Eight | August 1976 | 0-345-25141-5 |
| Star Trek Log Nine | February 1977 | 0-345-25557-7 |
| Star Trek Log Ten | January 1978 | 0-345-27212-9 |

=== Omnibus editions (1993) ===
Omnibus editions published by Del Rey. Log Ten (1978) was excluded.

| Title | Date | ISBN |
|---|---|---|
| Star Trek Log One / Log Two / Log Three | January 1993 | 0-345-38247-1 |
| Star Trek Log Four / Log Five / Log Six | July 1993 | 0-345-38522-5 |
| Star Trek Log Seven / Log Eight / Log Nine | August 1993 | 0-345-38561-6 |

=== The Animated Series (1996) ===
Star Trek: The Animated Series omnibus editions were published as part of Star Trek's 30th Anniversary celebration by Del Rey Books. A serialized essay by Foster was included, as well as corrections to the original text. Some printings distributed outside of North America omitted The Animated Series subtitle.

| Title | Date | ISBN |
|---|---|---|
| Log One and Two | September 1996 | 0-345-40939-6 |
| Log Three and Four | September 1996 | 0-345-40940-X |
| Log Five and Six | September 1996 | 0-345-40941-8 |
| Log Seven and Eight | September 1996 | 0-345-40942-6 |
| Log Nine and Ten | September 1996 | 0-345-40943-4 |

=== Pocket Books reprints (1995) ===
Omnibus editions published by Pocket Books for the United Kingdom and Australian / New Zealand markets. Variants were later made available in North America. Some printings include Star Trek: The Animate Series cover art, however the interior title pages and versos read Star Trek Log.

| Title | Date | ISBN |
|---|---|---|
| Star Trek Logs 1 – 3 | April 1995 | 0-671-85403-8 |
| Star Trek Logs 4 – 6 | May 1995 | 0-671-85404-6 |
| Star Trek Logs 7 – 10 | June 1995 | 0-671-85405-4 |

== Other editions ==
The series was reprinted by Corgi, and by German publishers Goldmann and Loewe from 1975 untl 1995. From 1978 to 1989, facsimile editions were manufactured by vanity presses Aeonian Press and Amereon.

=== Corgi reprints (1975–76) ===
Corgi released reprints in limited quantities to the U.K., Australia and New Zealand. Reprints for Log Six through Ten were scheduled for 1977, but later withdrawn.

| Title | Date | ISBN |
|---|---|---|
| Log One | April 1975 | 0-552-09747-0 |
| Log Two | July 1975 | 0-552-09830-2 |
| Log Three | July 1975 | 0-552-10045-9 (Note: ISBN listed on book cover and title page verso is invalid. The correct number is 0-552-10045-5.) |
| Log Four | March 1976 | 0-552-10107-9 |
| Log Five | November 1976 | 0-552-10315-2 |

=== Raumschiff Enterprise (1993–1995) ===
The series was translated for the German-language market as Raumschiff Enterprise: Die neuen Abenteuer. Distributed in various formats from 1993 to 1995 by publishers Goldmann and Loewe.

| No. | Title | Goldmann-Verlag | | Loewe-Verlag | |
| No. | Title | Date | ISBN | Date | ISBN |
|---|---|---|---|---|---|
| 1 | Todeszone Galaxis | 1993 | 3-442-23660-6 | 1994 | 3-7855-2741-1 |
| 2 | Der Überlebende | 1993 | 3-442-23661-4 | 1994 | 3-7855-2742-X |
| 3 | Der Venus-Faktor | 1993 | 3-442-23662-2 | 1994 | 3-7855-2743-8 |
| 4 | Gefahr im Delta-Dreieck | 1993 | 3-442-23663-0 | 1994 | 3-7855-2744-6 |
| 5 | Ums nackte Leben | 1993 | 3-442-23664-9 | 1995 | 3-7855-2765-9 |
| 6 | Mordsache McCoy | 1994 | 3-442-23665-7 | 1995 | 3-7855-2766-7 |
| 7 | Im Schatten schwarzer Sterne | 1994 | 3-442-23666-5 | 1995 | 3-7855-2767-5 |
| 8 | Himmelfahrtskommando | 1994 | 3-442-23667-3 | 1995 | 3-7855-2768-3 |
| 9 | Ein fataler Fehler | 1994 | 3-442-23668-1 | | |
| 10 | Die letzte Mission | 1994 | 3-442-23670-3 | | |

== See also ==
- Star Trek (Bantam Books)
- List of Star Trek novels
