= Neutron Star (short story) =

1966 English-language entry by Larry Niven

- Short story by Larry Niven
- Illustrator: Dan Adkins
- Country: United States
- Language: English
- Genre: Science fiction short story

Publication
- Published in: Worlds of If
- Publication type: Periodical
- Publisher: Galaxy Publishing Corporation
- Media type: Print (Magazine)
- Publication date: October 1966
- Pages: 16
- Award: Hugo Award for Best Short Story (1967)
- Series: Known Space

"Neutron Star" is an English language science fiction short story by American writer Larry Niven. It was originally published in the October 1966 issue (Issue 107, Vol 16, No 10) of Worlds of If. It was later reprinted in the collection of the same name and Crashlander. The story is set in Niven's fictional Known Space universe. It is notable for including a neutron star before their (then hypothetical) existence was widely known.

"Neutron Star" is the first to feature Beowulf Shaeffer, the ex-pilot and reluctant hero of many of Niven's Known Space stories. It also marked the first appearance of the nearly indestructible General Products starship hull, as well as its creators, the Pierson's Puppeteers. The star itself, BVS-1, is featured in the novel Protector (1973), where it is named "Phssthpok's Star". A prelude to the story is also included in the novel Juggler of Worlds.

== Plot summary ==
Beowulf Shaeffer, a native of the planet We Made It and unemployed for the last eight months due to a stock market crash, is contracted by a Pierson's Puppeteer, the Regional President of General Products on We Made It, to pilot a General Products-hulled starship in a close approach about neutron star BVS-1. The Puppeteers want to determine why two previous researchers, Peter and Sonya Laskin, were killed during the previous attempt on a similar mission. Shaeffer has no intention of even attempting the dangerous mission but agrees anyway — he has other plans.

He has the Puppeteers construct what he dubs the Skydiver to his precise specifications, supposedly to ensure he survives to return with the relevant data. It includes an advanced sensor package, a high-powered thruster, and a high-powered laser. It is thus the only warship ever constructed by the cowardly and paranoid alien race — a prize beyond value and a perfect means of escape.

Sigmund Ausfaller is an operative of the UN's Bureau of Alien Affairs. Desiring to maintain human-Puppeteer relations, Ausfaller explains the situation to them, and has them install a bomb on the ship. Ausfaller informs Shaeffer that if he does not attempt the mission, he will be sent to debtors' prison, and that if he attempts to escape in the ship, the bomb will be detonated within a week — well before he could even reach another planet, let alone find a buyer for the ship. Shaeffer, realizing he is trapped, agrees to fly the mission.

The Skydiver reaches the neutron star, and the ship's autopilot puts the Skydiver into a hyperbolic orbit that will take 24 hours to reach periapsis with BVS-1, passing a mile above its surface. During the descent, Schaeffer notices many unusual things: the stars ahead of him began to turn blue from Doppler shift as his speed increases enormously; the stars behind him, rather than being red-shifted, were blue too as their light accelerated with him into the gravity well of the neutron star. The nose of the ship is pulled towards the neutron star even when he tries to move the ship to view his surroundings.

As the mysterious pull exceeds one Earth gravity, Shaeffer accelerates the Skydiver to compensate for the unknown X-force until he is in free fall (though the accelerometer registers 1.2 gees). Shaeffer eventually realizes what the X-force is: the tidal force. The strong tidal pull of the neutron star is trying to force the ends of the ship (and Shaeffer himself) into two separate orbits. Shaeffer programs the autopilot in a thrust pattern that allows him to reach the center of mass of the ship in effective free fall, though he nearly fails to do so. The ship reaches periapsis where tidal forces nearly pull Shaeffer apart anyway, but he manages to hold himself in the access space at the ship's center of mass and survives.

After returning to We Made It, Shaeffer is hospitalized (he has received a sunburn by starlight blue-shifted into the ultraviolet) for observation at the Puppeteer's insistence. While explaining tidal forces to the Puppeteer, Schaeffer realizes the alien had no knowledge of tides, something that would be elementary for a sentient species living on a world with a moon. The Puppeteers are extremely cautious when dealing with other species, and keep all details about their homeworld secret. When Schaeffer mentions that he can tell reporters the fact that the Puppeteer's world has no moon, the Puppeteer agrees to give Shaeffer a million stars (a fortune in galactic currency) in return for his silence. Shaeffer asks the alien how he likes being blackmailed for a change.

== Notes ==
- In the story "Ghost", included as framing story for the Crashlander collection, Schaeffer is told that the Puppeteers were well aware of the tidal effect. The actual motive for them paying for Shaeffer's silence was that if they did not, he would realize this. By paying him, they could both shut him up and disseminate false information about the Puppeteer homeworld.
- In the "Afterthoughts" section of the Tales of Known Space collection, Niven writes: "I keep meeting people who have done mathematical treatments of the problem raised in the short story 'Neutron Star' ... Alas and dammit, Shaeffer can't survive. It turns out that his ship leaves the star spinning, and keeps the spin."

== Reception ==
"Neutron Star" won the Hugo Award for Best Short Story and ranked #30 in the LOCUS Magazine Readers Poll, All-time Best Novellette.

Carl Sagan criticized "Neutron Star" for assuming that tidal forces produced by gravity would be forgotten, and that a crewed ship would not be the first to explore a neutron star.

Reviewing the collection Neutron Star, Algis Budrys said that the story was "in itself worth the paperback price of admission".

== See also ==
- Neutron stars in fiction
