= Bridging the Galaxies =

1993 collection of science fiction stories by Larry Niven

- Cover of the first edition.
- Author: Larry Niven
- Cover artist: Alicia Austin
- Language: English
- Genre: Science fiction
- Publisher: San Francisco Science Fiction Conventions
- Publication date: 1993
- Publication place: United States
- Media type: Print (hardcover)
- Pages: 197

Bridging the Galaxies is a collection of science fiction stories by American writer Larry Niven, published in hardcover by San Francisco Science Fiction Conventions in September 1993 for the 51st World Science Fiction Convention (ConFrancisco), held September 2–6, 1993 in San Francisco, California.

The book contains four short stories, three essays, a planetarium script, and a poem, together with an introduction and a bibliography.

== Contents ==
- "In Memoriam: Howard Grote Littlemead" (poem)
- "Introduction"
- "Procrustes"
- "Where Next, Columbus?" (essay) (with Jerry Pournelle)
- "The Color of Sunfire"
- "The Léshy Circuit: Unfinished Script for Planetarium Show"
- "Tabletop Fusion" (essay)
- "The South Los Angeles Broadcasting System"
- "It's Only a Story"
- "Intercon Trip Report: August 12, 1991" (essay)
- "All the Bridges Rusting"
- "Bibliography" (Tom Whitmore)
