= O'Neill cylinder =

Space settlement concept

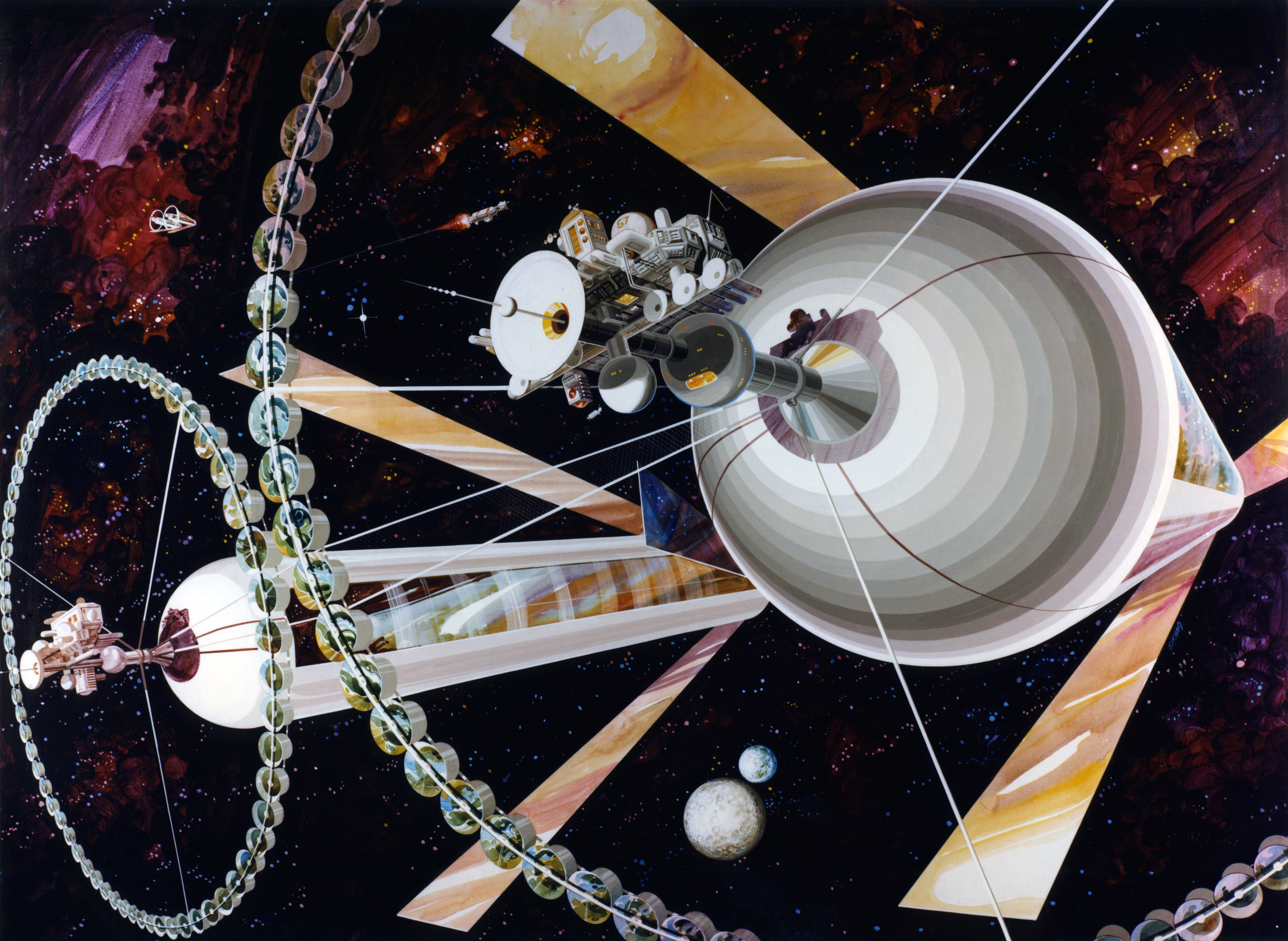
Artist's depiction of a pair of O'Neill cylinders

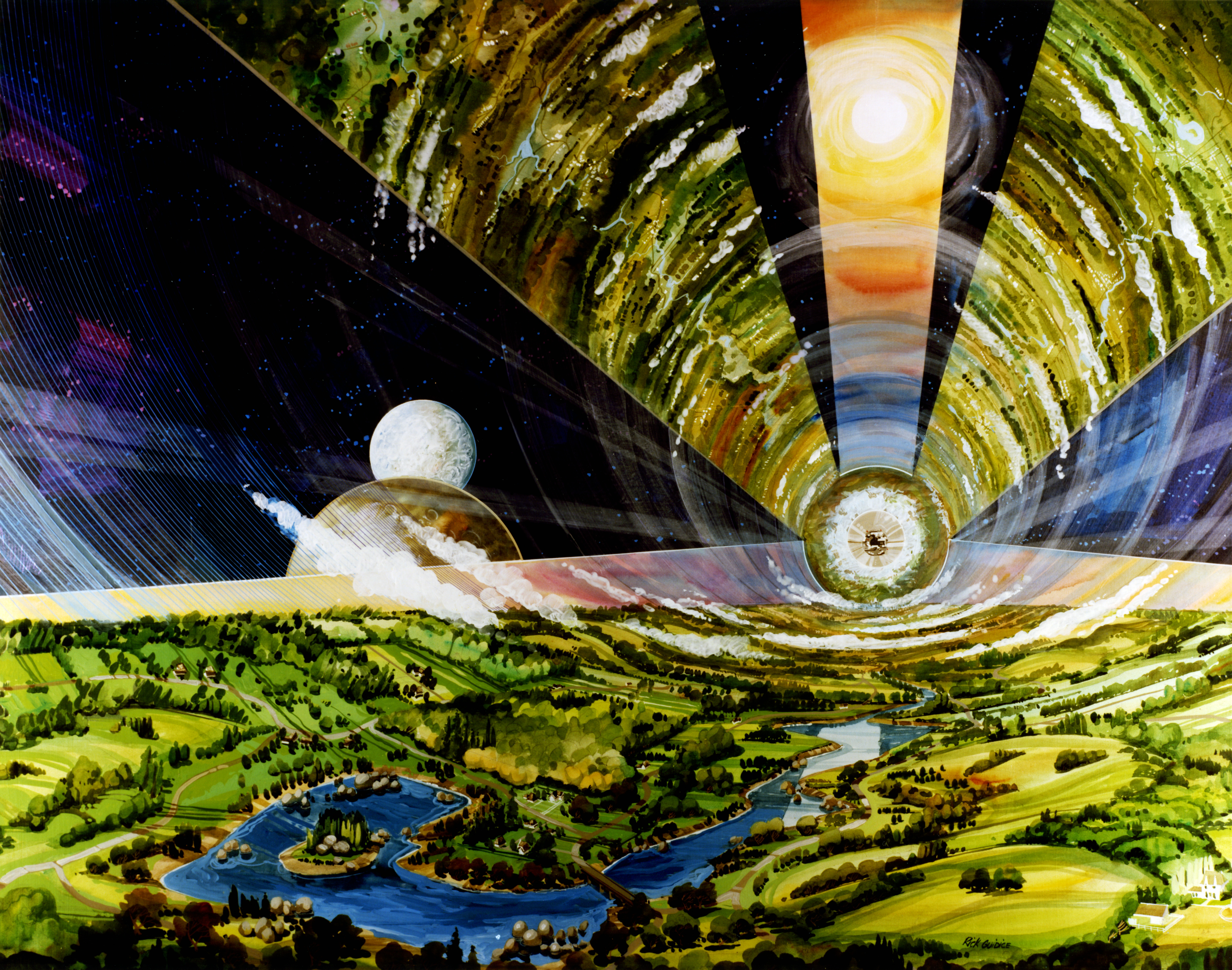
Interior view, showing alternating land and window segments

An O'Neill cylinder (also called an O'Neill colony, or Island Three) is a space settlement concept proposed by American physicist Gerard K. O'Neill in his 1976 book The High Frontier: Human Colonies in Space. O'Neill proposed the colonization of space for the 21st century, using materials extracted from the Moon and later from asteroids.

An O'Neill cylinder would consist of two counter-rotating cylinders. The cylinders would rotate in opposite directions to cancel any gyroscopic effects that would otherwise make it difficult to keep them aimed toward the Sun. Each would be 6.4 kilometers (4 mi) or 8.0 kilometers (5 mi) in diameter and 32 kilometers (20 mi) long, connected at each end by a rod via a bearing system. Their rotation would provide artificial gravity.

== Background ==
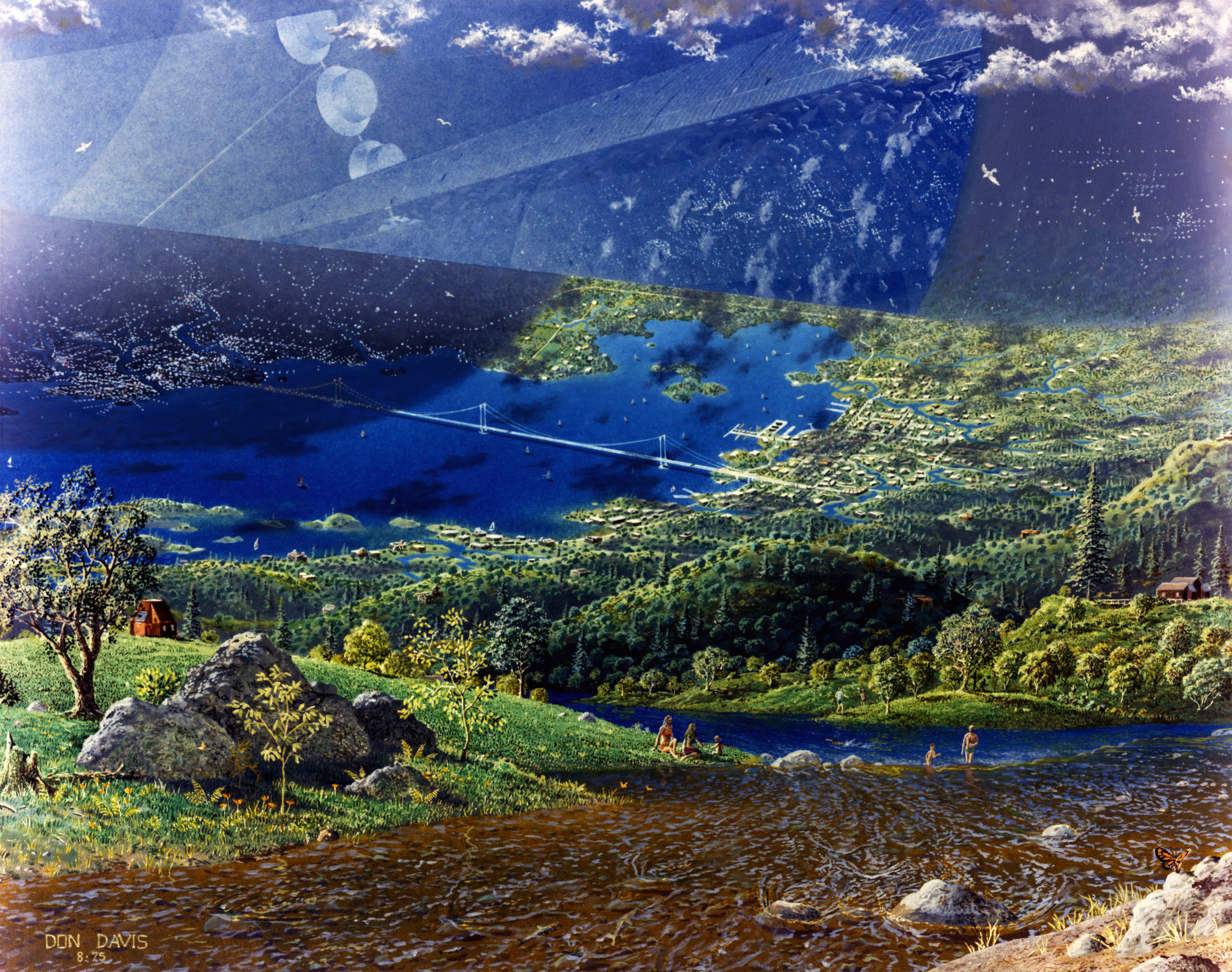
An impression of the interior of an O'Neill cylinder by Don Davis, showing the curvature of the inner surface.

While teaching undergraduate physics at Princeton University, O'Neill set his students on the task of designing large structures in outer space, with the intent of showing that sustainable living in space could be possible. Several of the designs were able to provide volumes large enough to be suitable for human habitation. This cooperative result inspired the idea of the cylinder and was first published by O'Neill in a September 1974 article of Physics Today.

O'Neill's project was not the first example of this concept. In 1954, German scientist Hermann Oberth described the use of gigantic habitable cylinders for space travel in his book Menschen im Weltraum—Neue Projekte für Raketen- und Raumfahrt (People in Space—New Projects for Rockets and Space Travel). In 1970, science-fiction author Larry Niven proposed a larger-scale concept in his novel Ringworld. Then, three years before O'Neill proposed his cylinder, Arthur C. Clarke used such a habitable cylinder (albeit of extraterrestrial construction) in his novel Rendezvous with Rama.

=== Islands ===
In his 1976 book, O'Neill described three reference designs, nicknamed "islands":

- Island One is a rotating sphere measuring 1.5 km (1 mi) in circumference (512 m or 1,681 ft in diameter), with people living on the equatorial region (see Bernal sphere). A later NASA/Ames study at Stanford University developed an alternative version of Island One: the Stanford torus, a toroidal shape 500 m (1,600 ft) in diameter.
- Island Two is spherical in design, 1,600 m (5,200 ft) in diameter.
- The Island Three design, better known as the O'Neill cylinder, consists of two counter-rotating cylinders. They are 6.4 km (4 mi) or 8.0 km (5 mi) in diameter and are capable of being scaled up to 32.2 km (20 mi) long. Each cylinder has six equal-area stripes that run the length of the cylinder; three are transparent windows, three are habitable "land" surfaces. Furthermore, an outer agricultural ring, 32.2 km (20 mi) in diameter, rotates at a different speed to support farming. The habitat's industrial manufacturing block is located in the middle, to allow for minimized gravity for some manufacturing processes.

To save the immense cost of rocketing the materials from Earth, these habitats would be built with materials launched into space from the Moon with a magnetic mass driver.

== Design ==
=== Living in the cylinder ===
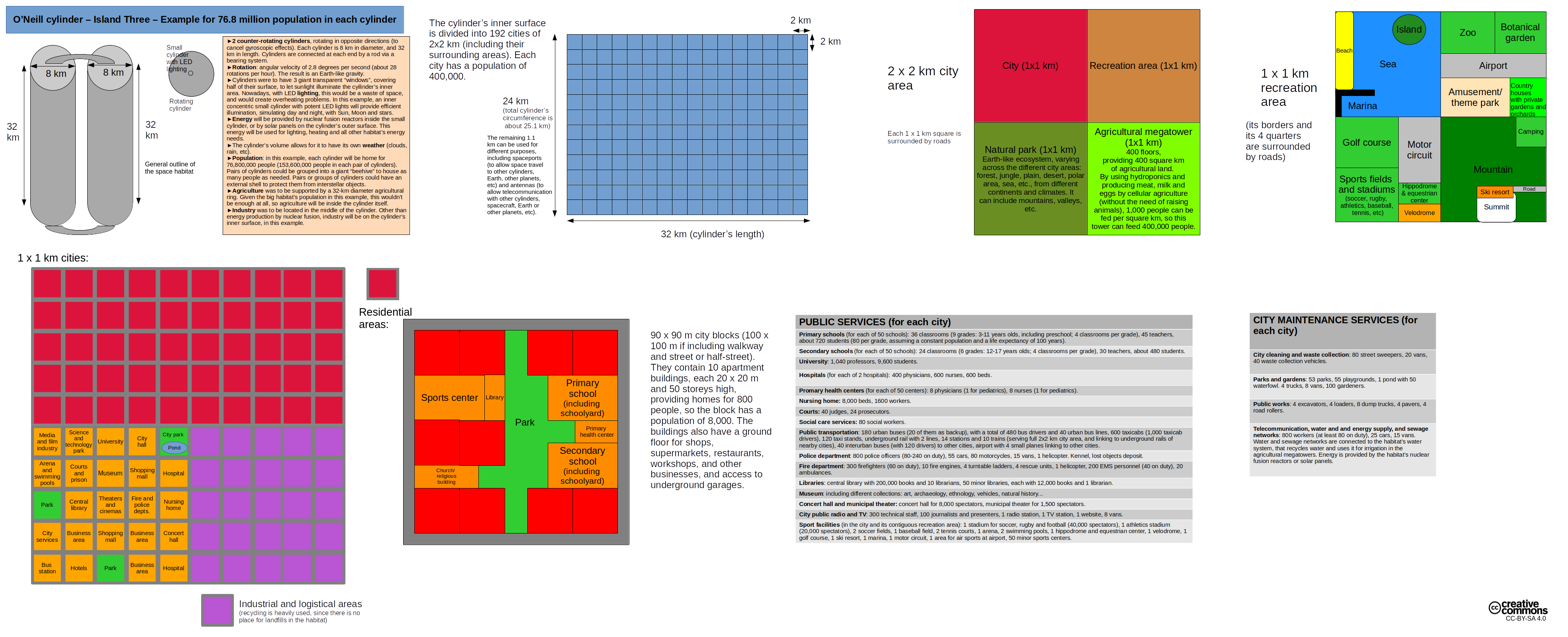
A diagram of an example of a pair of O'Neill cylinders (Island Three)

In the September 1974 edition of Physics Today magazine, Dr. O'Neill argued that life on board an O'Neill cylinder would be better than some places on Earth. This would be because of an abundance in food, climate and weather control, and the fact that there would be no need for vehicles that use combustion engines that would create smog and pollution. The inhabitants would also keep themselves active and entertained by practicing current earth sports such as skiing, sailing, and mountain climbing, thanks to artificially generated gravity due to the cylinder's rotation. In addition to these sports, new sports would also be created out of the habitat being enclosed in a cylinder in space, and these circumstances would be creatively taken advantage of.

=== Artificial gravity ===
The cylinders rotate to provide artificial gravity on their inner surface. At the radius described by O'Neill, the habitats would have to rotate about twenty-eight times an hour to simulate a standard Earth gravity; an angular velocity of 2.8 degrees per second. Research on human factors in rotating reference frames indicate that, at such low rotation speeds, few people would experience motion sickness due to coriolis forces acting on the inner ear. People would, however, be able to detect spinward and antispinward directions by turning their heads, and any dropped items would appear to be deflected by a few centimetres. The central axis of the habitat would be a zero-gravity region, and it was envisaged that recreational facilities could be located there.

Note that a single isolated cylinder, as depicted in the Babylon 5 series, would be dynamically unstable.

=== Atmosphere and radiation ===
The habitat was planned to have oxygen at partial pressures roughly similar to terrestrial air, 20% of the Earth's sea-level air pressure. Nitrogen would also be included to add a further 30% of the Earth's pressure. This half-pressure atmosphere would save gas and reduce the needed strength and thickness of the habitat walls.

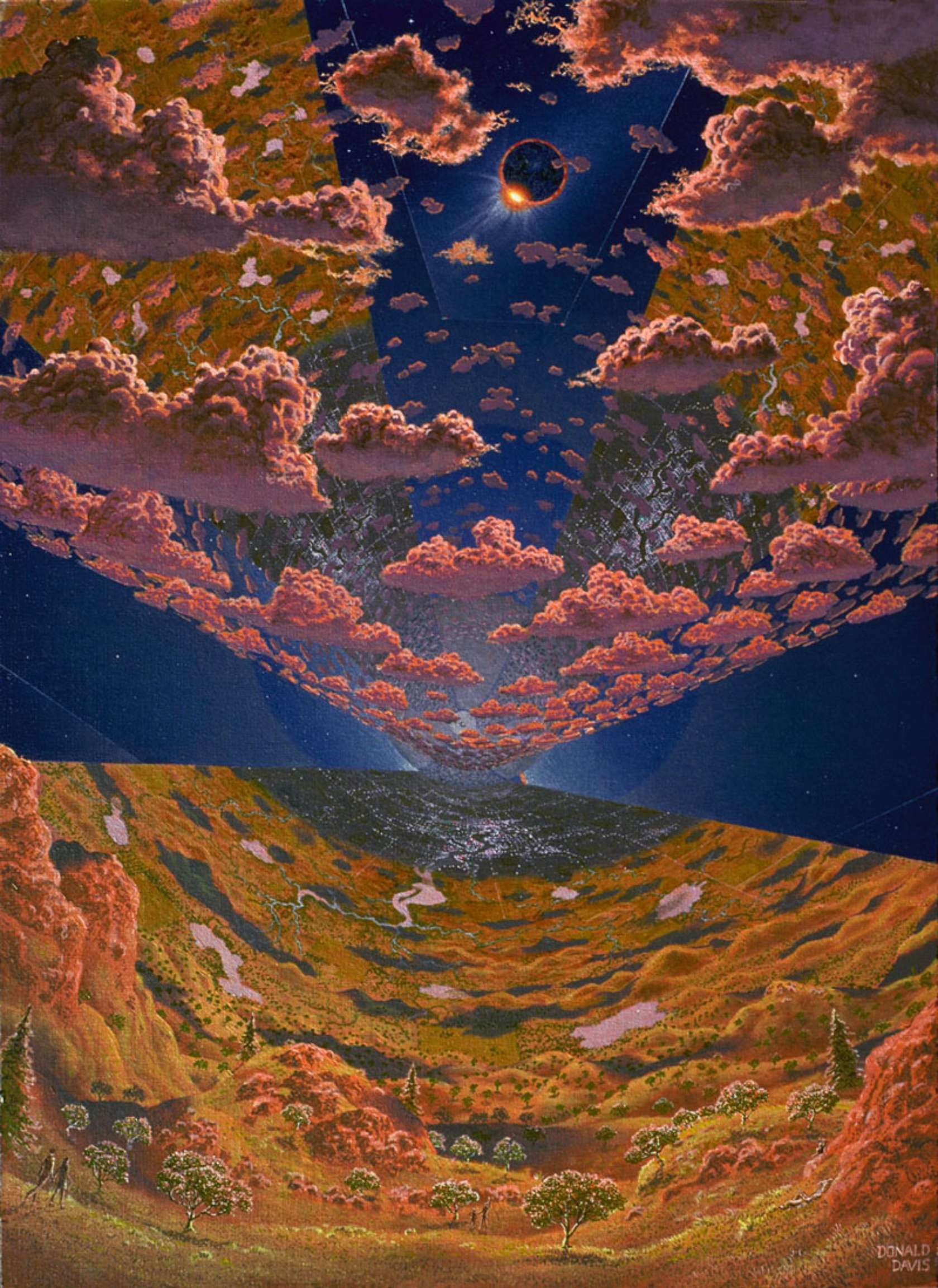
Artist's depiction of the interior of an O'Neill cylinder, illuminated by reflected sunlight

At this scale, the air within the cylinder and the shell of the cylinder provide adequate shielding against cosmic rays. The internal volume of an O'Neill cylinder is great enough to support its own small weather systems, which may be manipulated by altering the internal atmospheric composition or the amount of reflected sunlight.

=== Sunlight ===
Large mirrors are hinged at the back of each stripe of window. The unhinged edge of the windows points toward the Sun. The purpose of the mirrors is to reflect sunlight into the cylinders through the windows. Night is simulated by opening the mirrors, letting the window view empty space; this also permits heat to radiate to space. During the day, the reflected Sun appears to move as the mirrors move, creating a natural progression of Sun angles. Although not visible to the naked eye, the Sun's image might be observed to rotate due to the cylinder's rotation. Light reflected by mirrors is polarized, which might confuse pollinating bees.

To permit light to enter the habitat, large windows run the length of the cylinder. These would not be single panes, but would be made up of many small sections, to prevent catastrophic damage, and so the aluminum or steel window frames can take most of the stresses of the air pressure of the habitat. Occasionally a meteoroid might break one of these panes. This would cause some loss of the atmosphere, but calculations showed that this would not be an emergency, due to the very large volume of the habitat.

=== Attitude control ===
The habitat and its mirrors must be perpetually aimed at the Sun to collect solar energy and light the habitat's interior. O'Neill and his students carefully worked out a method of continuously turning the colony 360 degrees per orbit without using rockets (which would shed reaction mass). First, the pair of habitats can be rolled by operating the cylinders as momentum wheels. If one habitat's rotation is slightly off, the two cylinders will rotate about each other. Once the plane formed by the two axes of rotation is perpendicular in the roll axis to the orbit, then the pair of cylinders can be yawed to aim at the Sun by exerting a force between the two sunward bearings. Pushing the cylinders away from each other will cause both cylinders to gyroscopically precess, and the system will yaw in one direction, while pushing them towards each other will cause yaw in the other direction. The counter-rotating habitats have no net gyroscopic effect, and so this slight precession can continue throughout the habitat's orbit, keeping it aimed at the Sun. This is a novel application of control moment gyroscopes.

== Design update and derivatives ==
In 1990 and 2007, a smaller design derivative known as Kalpana One was presented, which addresses the wobbling effect of a single rotating cylinder by increasing the diameter and shortening the length. The logistical challenges of radiation shielding are allayed by construction of the station in low Earth orbit and removing the windows.

In 2014, a new construction method was suggested that involved inflating a bag and taping it with a spool (constructed from asteroidal materials), like the construction of a composite overwrapped pressure vessel.

=== McKendree cylinder ===
In 1996, Tom McKendree, an engineer, proposed a larger rotating space habitat. He expanded upon the idea in 2000, at NASA's Turning Goals into Reality conference.

Instead of traditional materials that were known at the time of the O'Neill cylinder's proposal, McKendree's habitat would be built using diamondoid materials or carbon nanotubes, allowing it to be built much larger. He said that such a habitat could be extended to a 461 km (~287 mi) radius and over 4,610 km (~2,865 mi) in length if built out of diamondoid materials, or a 1,120 km (~696 mi) radius and over 11,200 km (~6,959 mi) in length if built out of carbon nanotubes.

Like O'Neill, McKendree proposed dedicating half of the surface of the colony to windows, allowing direct illumination of the interior. The habitat would be composed of a pair of counter-rotating cylinders which would function like momentum wheels to control the habitat's orientation. On the basis of the materials and size, he estimated that such a habitat could house populations of 40 billion to 250 billion people.

This concept has since been called the McKendree cylinder.

== Proposal ==
At a Blue Origin event in Washington on May 9, 2019, Jeff Bezos proposed building O'Neill colonies rather than colonizing other planets.

== In fiction ==
- 2312 – 2012 novel by Kim Stanley Robinson. O'Neill cylinders in hollowed-out asteroids
- Babylon 5 - 1994 television series
- Citadel (Mass Effect) - Video game series
- Cyberpunk - Role-playing game
- Death's End - 2010 novel by Liu Cixin
- Heaven's River - 2021 novel
- Eon - 1985 novel by Greg Bear
- Halo - Video game series
- Interstellar - 2014 film
- Mobile Suit Gundam - 1979 television anime
- Orion's Arm - Science fiction world-building project (Note: McKendree cylinders, the newer and larger proposed variant of O'Neill cylinders, are a type of habitat in the fictional universe of the Orion's Arm world-building project. In this world, they measure 1,000 km in radius and 10,000 km long, containing 63 million km^{2} (24 million mi^{2}) of living space, which is greater than the continent of Eurasia.)
- Policenauts - 1994 video game
- Rendezvous with Rama - Novels by Arthur C. Clarke
- Ringworld - Novels by Larry Niven
- Schismatrix - 1985 novel by Bruce Sterling
- The Expanse – Novels and television series
- Vanquish - 2010 video game

== Image gallery ==
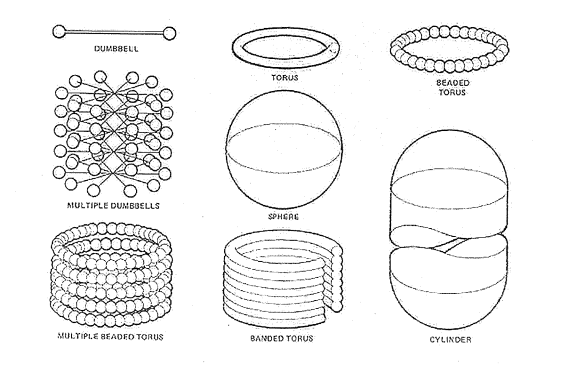
A cylinder constructed from interconnected bolas or other geometries

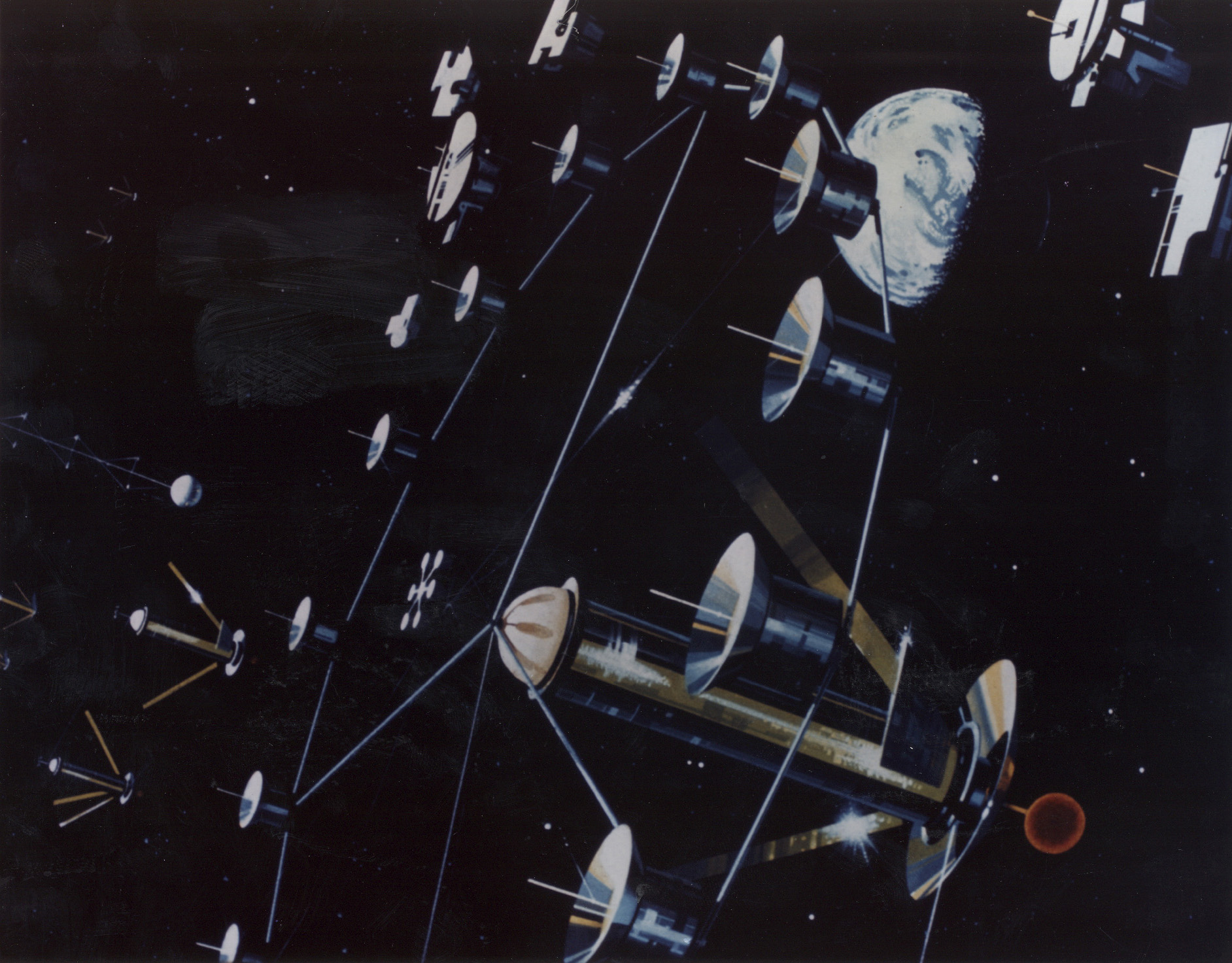
A NASA concept image of multiple habitat cylinders oriented towards the Sun

== See also ==
- Space stations and habitats in fiction
- Rotor (ride) – this, the Gravitron, and some other amusement park rides use centrifugal force in a similar manner.
- Bishop Ring (habitat)
- Centrifuge Accommodations Module, a cancelled ISS module
- Don Davis (artist)
- Dyson sphere
- Planetary chauvinism
- Rotating wheel space station
- Skyhook (structure)
- Stanford torus
- The High Frontier (Book)
