= Gravitron =

Amusement ride

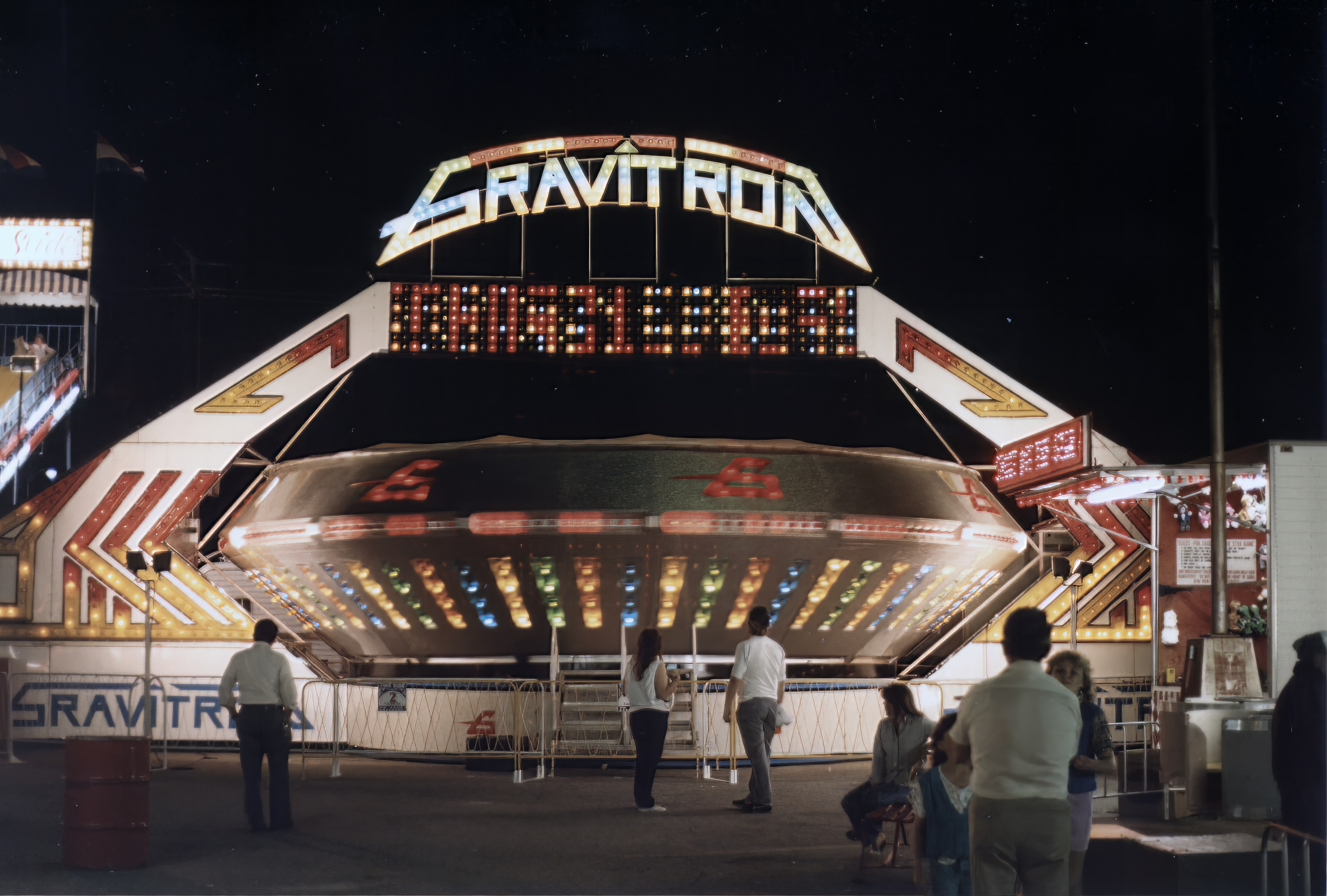
A Gravitron at an amusement park in the 1980s

The Gravitron (Note: known by many other names, see § Names) is an amusement ride, most commonly found as a portable ride at fairs and carnivals. The Gravitron first appeared at Morey's Piers in 1983, designed and manufactured by Wisdom Industries. It is a modification of an earlier ride called the Rotor.

== Names ==
The Gravitron is known by a variety of names, including:

- Alien Abduction
- Alien Invasion
- Area 51
- Devil's Hole
- Enterprise
- Exodus
- Flight to Mars
- Starship (Note: Sometimes followed by a 4-digit number such as 2000, 3000, etc.)
- Starship Area 51
- Starship Exodus
- Starship Gravitron
- Starship Invaders
- Twister
- UFO

== Design and operation ==
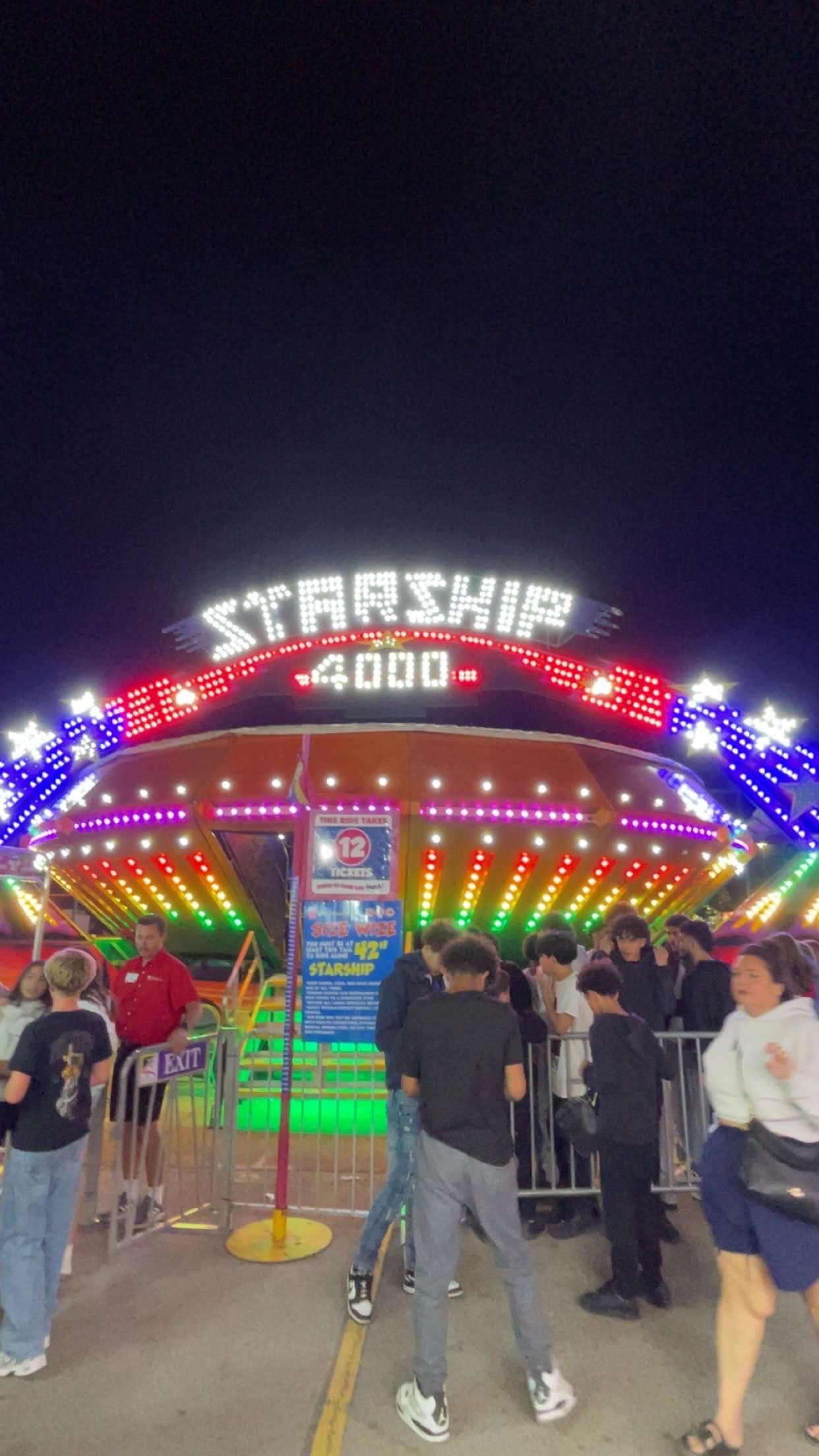
A Starship 4000 at night at the Western Fair in London, Canada in September 2025

The Gravitron first appeared at Morey's Piers in 1983 and quickly became a fixture at amusement parks in many countries. It is a modification of an earlier ride called the Rotor. The ride was originally designed and manufactured by Wisdom Industries.

The ride is completely enclosed, with 48 vertically sliding padded panels lining the inside wall. Riders lean against these panels, which are angled back. Since the riders move instead of the floor, the Gravitron eliminates a design flaw of the Rotor where passengers’ feet could be wedged between the moving floor and the wall, one instance of which occurred on the Cajun Cliffhanger rotor at Six Flags Great America.

The physics of the Gravitron can be explained using concepts from AP Physics C: Mechanics. As the ride rotates, the rider experiences a centrifugal force pointing outward from the ride's center. This force, along with the slant in the walls, allows the panels to rise up and the riders to be completely supported by the walls, without their feet touching the ground. The ride can rotate at a maximum frequency of 24 rpm. It reaches that frequency in less than 20 seconds, due to the 33 kW 3-phase motor. At this point, the riders are experiencing centrifugal force equivalent to three times the force of gravity.

The original or older designs of the ride would usually feature a lit up sign saying "THRILLER" or similar, but newer variants of the ride appear to have dropped this feature.

The ride operator is located in the center of the ride. Part of the operator's duty is to control lighting and music in addition to the ride itself. Some variants include closed-circuit television cameras, allowing waiting riders and passersby to observe the ride in action.

There are a few versions of this ride that do not have a ceiling (i.e., the top canvas is not installed).

The entire ride racks on a single 15-metre (50 ft) trailer for transport. The ride can be assembled in less than six hours, and packed up in three.

== Incidents ==
On August 20, 1991, a Gravitron spun itself apart at the Missouri State Fair, injuring seven children. The accident led to a multi-party lawsuit against Murphy Enterprises, the operator of the ride, and Wisdom Manufacturing, resulting in modifications to the rides and stricter safety standards.

In April 2004, an accident occurred at the Dade County Youth Fair in Miami, Florida, when a panel came off and three riders were ejected. One of these ejected riders was a 16-year-old girl who was critically injured. Seven people were injured, including two people outside the ride that were hit by debris. As a result, DCYF strengthened their safety guidelines and removed the ride from the park.

On September 8, 2007, a teenage boy was injured while riding a Gravitron at the Spokane County Interstate Fair in Washington State. The boy hit his head on a metal part of the ride and needed two staples in his scalp to close the wound. Witnesses reported that the boy ignored safety warnings and climbed the walls of the ride while it was in motion. State investigators determined that the ride was safe and that the accident was the result of the victim's behavior.

At the Smith County, Tennessee, Fair on July 7, 2023, one worker died after being struck on the head as a service team greased bearings on a Gravitron, due to miscommunication with the all-clear to test rotation and the path of a pole.

== Locations ==
• Guatemala: One is in use at the Esquilandia Amusement Park at Zone 2, Guatemala City.

- Australia: At least six; Vortex at Dreamworld (removed in 2009) and five traveling models.
- Bahamas: The Holiday Carnival hosts this ride.
- Canada: One is owned by Hinchey's Rides and Amusements, another by West Coast Amusements under the name Alien Abduction, one is owned by Puck's Farm near Toronto, and another is in Vancouver's Pacific National Exhibition, and is called Starship 3000 instead of Gravitron. Another tours Newfoundland every summer with Thomas Amusements, and is called Starship 3000 (previously Starship 2000 before refurbishment). One more Starship 3000 is owned by Albion Amusements, which makes a stop at Wasaga Beach, Ontario. One is also owned by Wild Rose Shows Attractions traveling all over Alberta some places in Saskatchewan, and it is called Area 51. One is owned by World's Finest Shows, and it is called Alien Abduction. A final one, owner by East Coast Amusements which makes the rounds of the Maritime provinces, is an open-top tilting variant and known as the Zero Gravity.
- Finland: Suomen Tivoli hosts this ride.
- Italy: Movieland (Caneva World) hosts this ride, called "Antares"
- New Zealand: Two are owned by Mahons Amusements, mobile.
- North America: Believed to be upwards of 40.
- Norway: One was in use at the Handelsstevnet trade fair in Skien, Telemark, during the 1990s.
- Oahu, Hawaii: One traveling model owned by Wood Ent. Co.; named Area 51
- United Kingdom: Alton Towers had this ride for three seasons from 1990 to 1992; it later moved to Pleasure Island. This ride is now located at the Barry Island Pleasure Park near Cardiff.

== Gallery ==
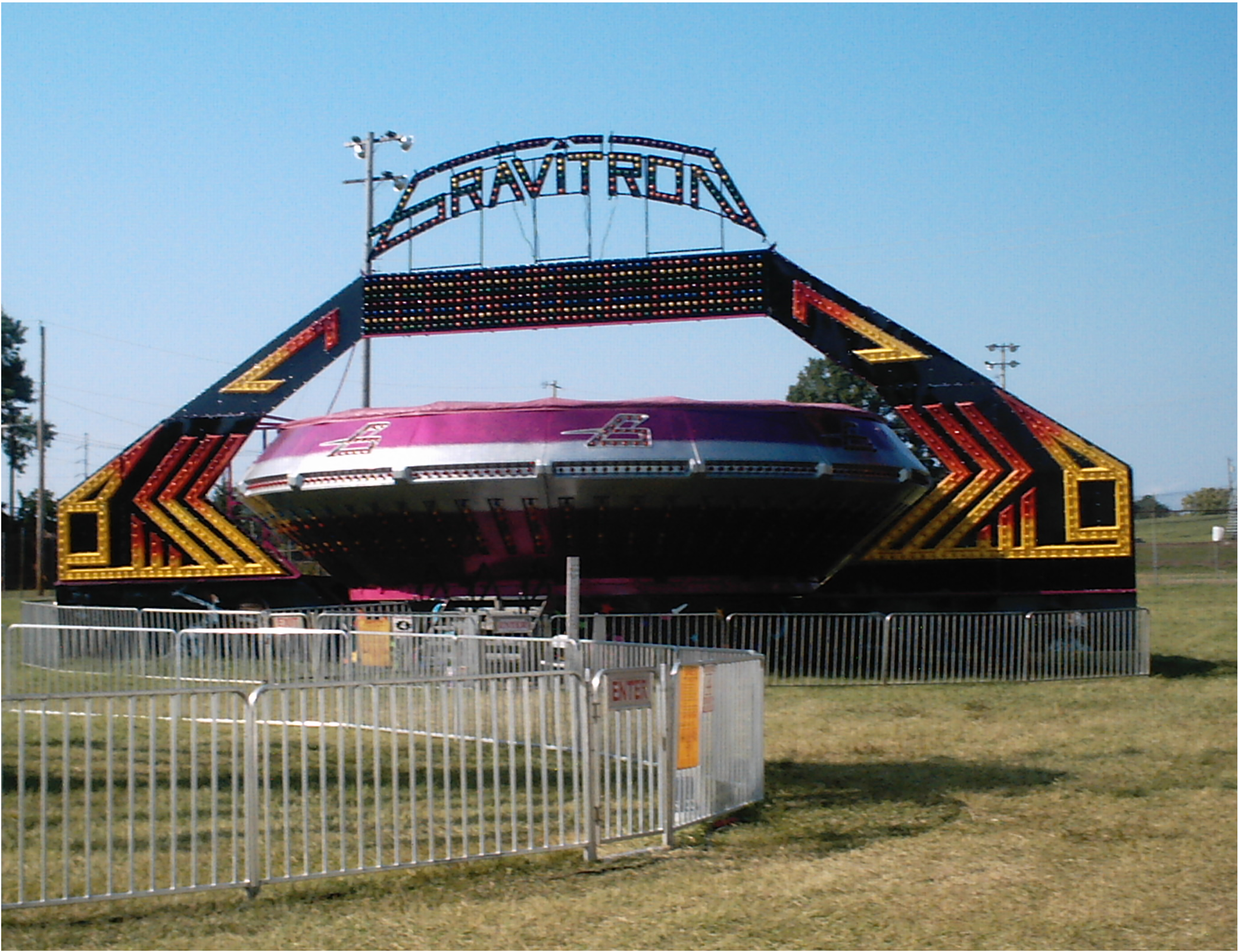
The exterior of a Gravitron in Madisonville, Kentucky

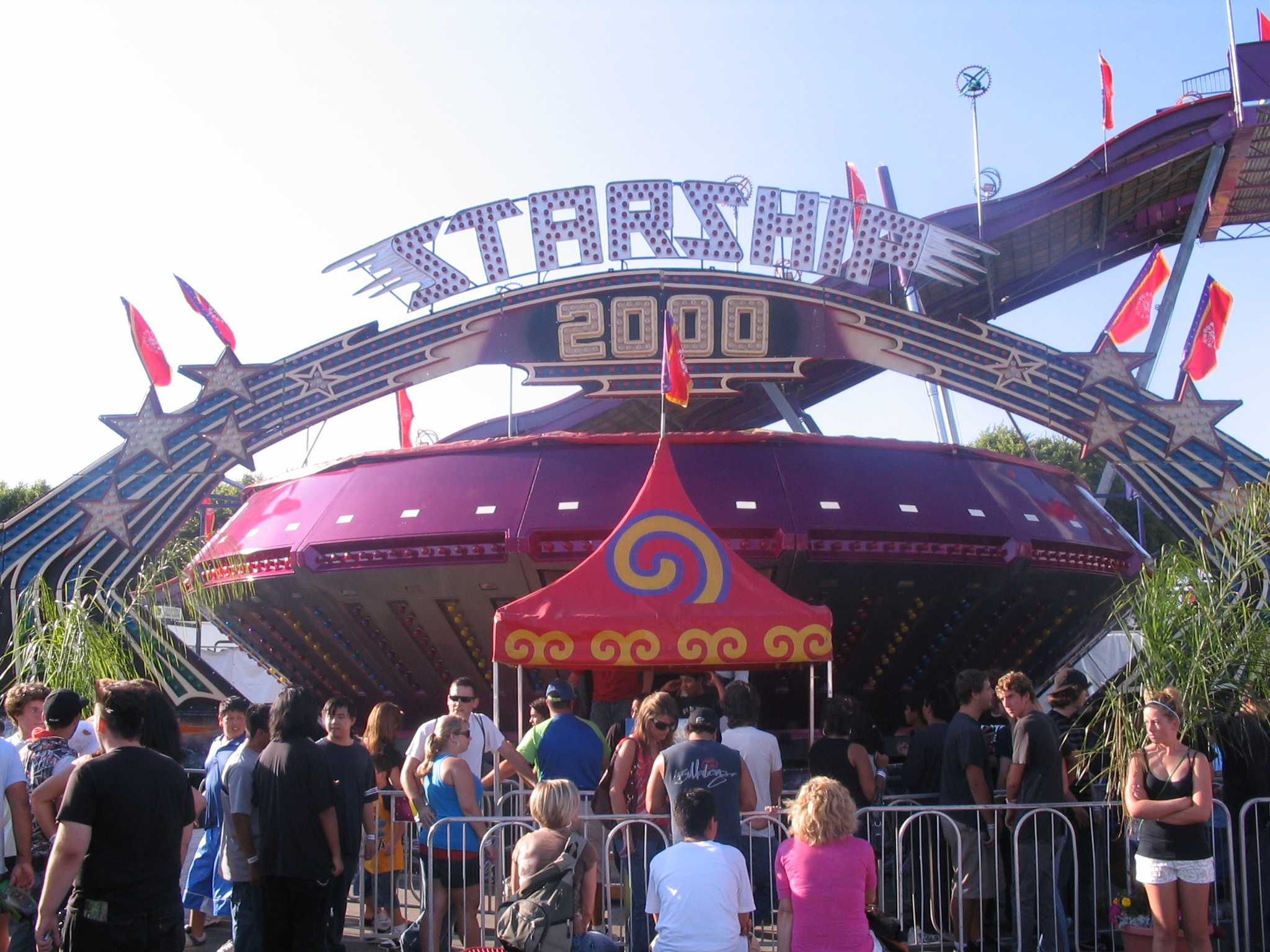
A Starship 2000 in Orange County, California

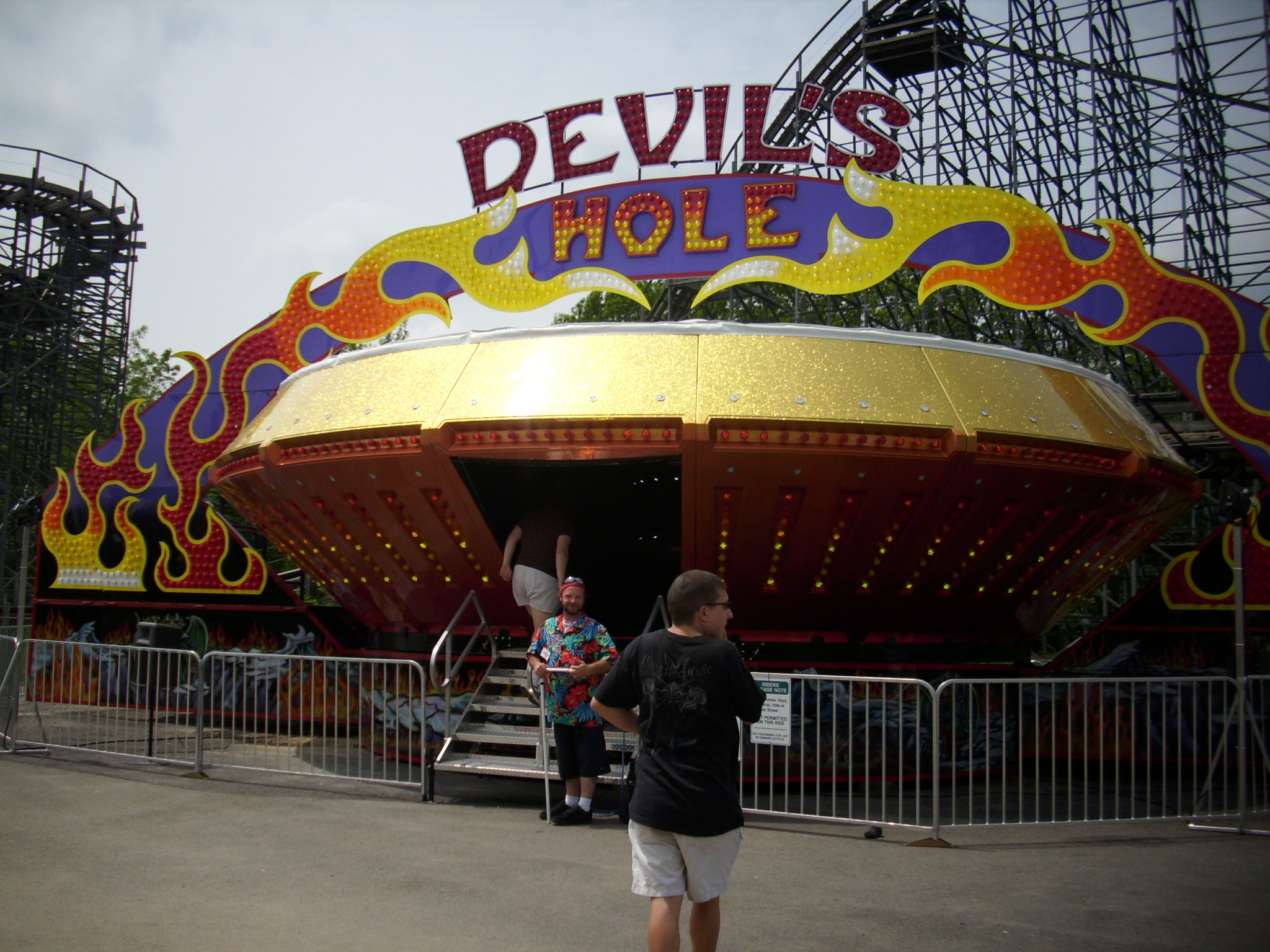
A Gravitron called "Devil's Hole" at Fantasy Island in Grand Island, New York

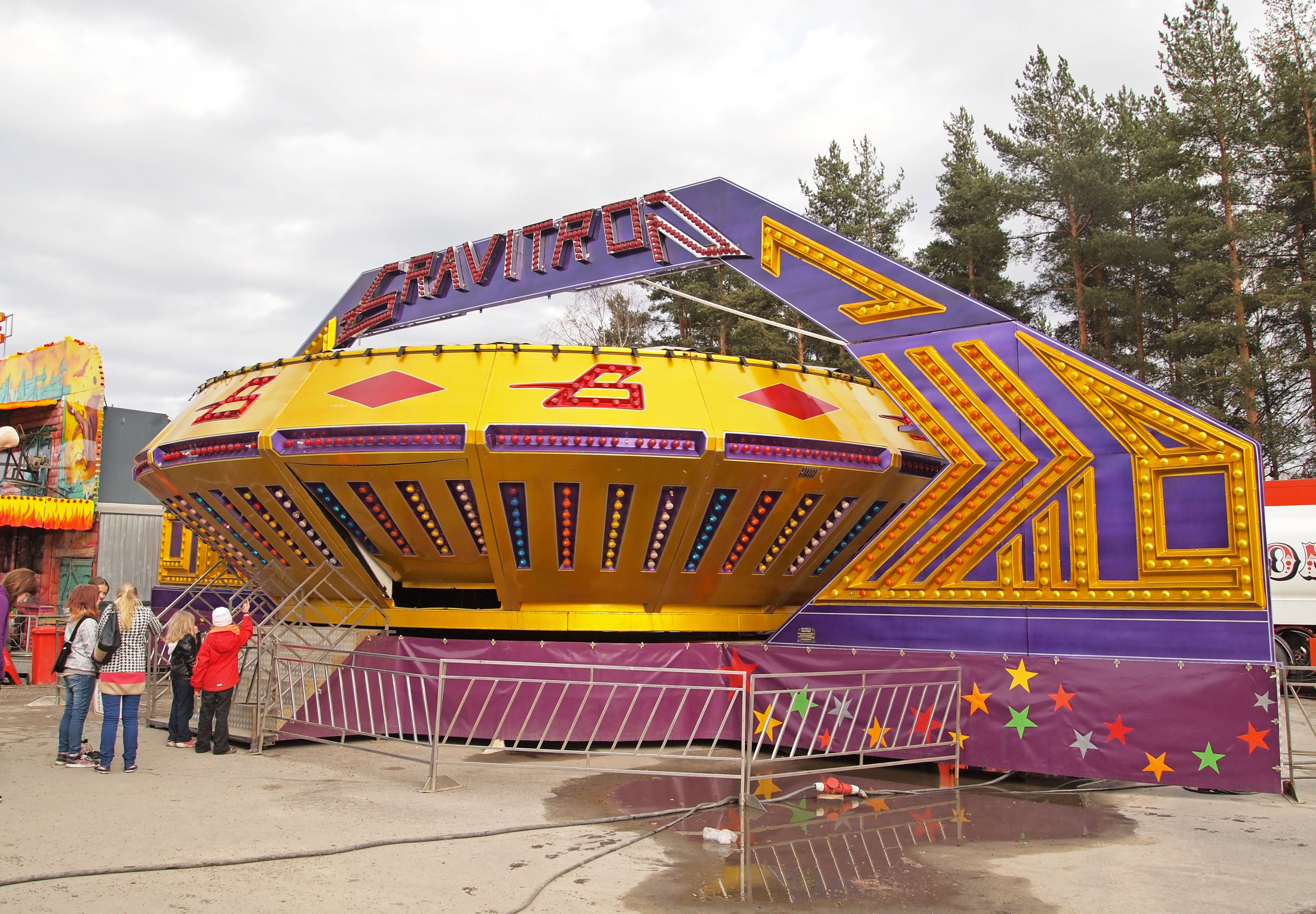
A Gravitron at Suomen Tivoli in Jyväskylä, Finland

== See also ==
- Rotor (ride)
- Round Up (ride)
- Tagada
