= Don Davis (artist) =

American artist

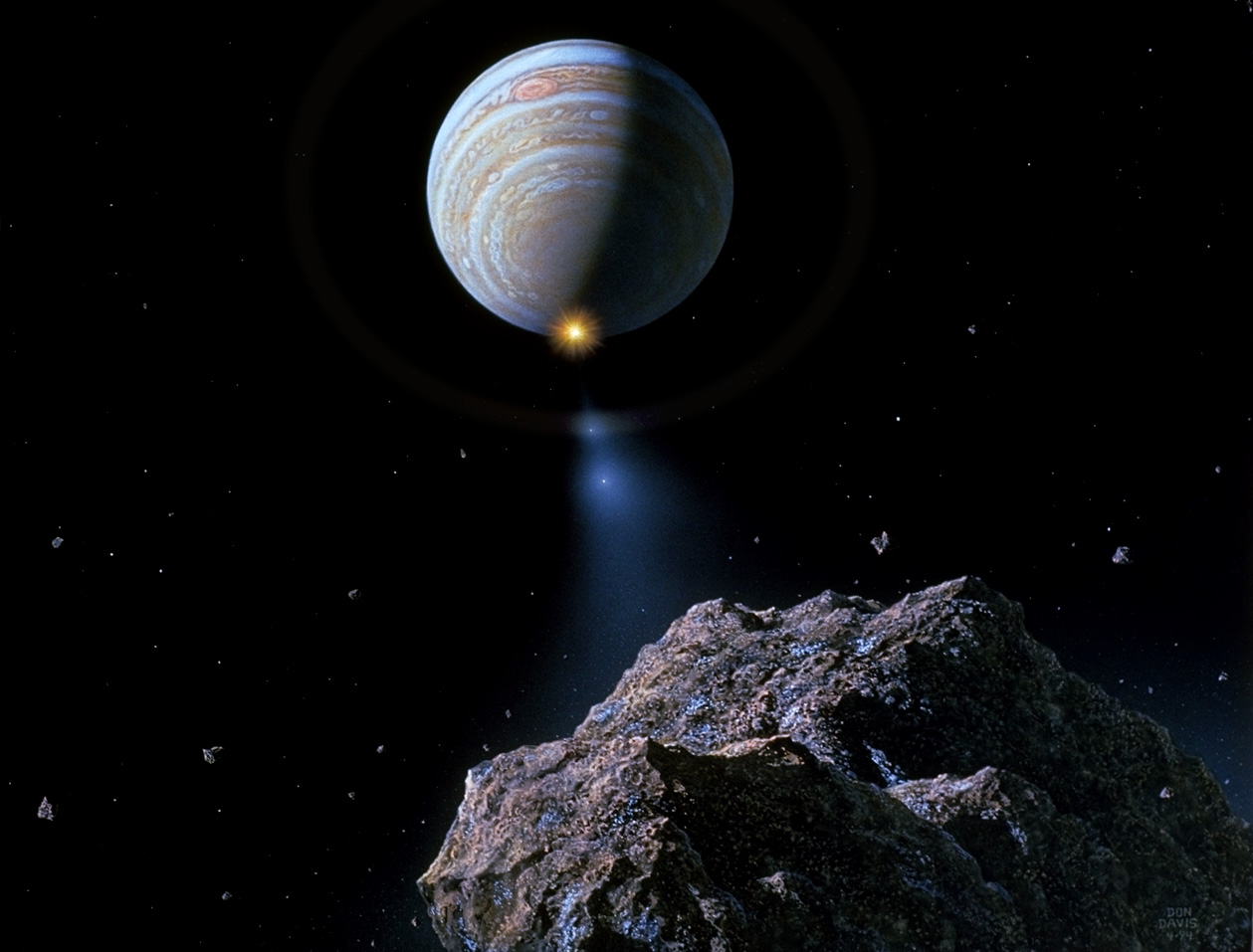
Comet Shoemaker–Levy 9 approaching Jupiter

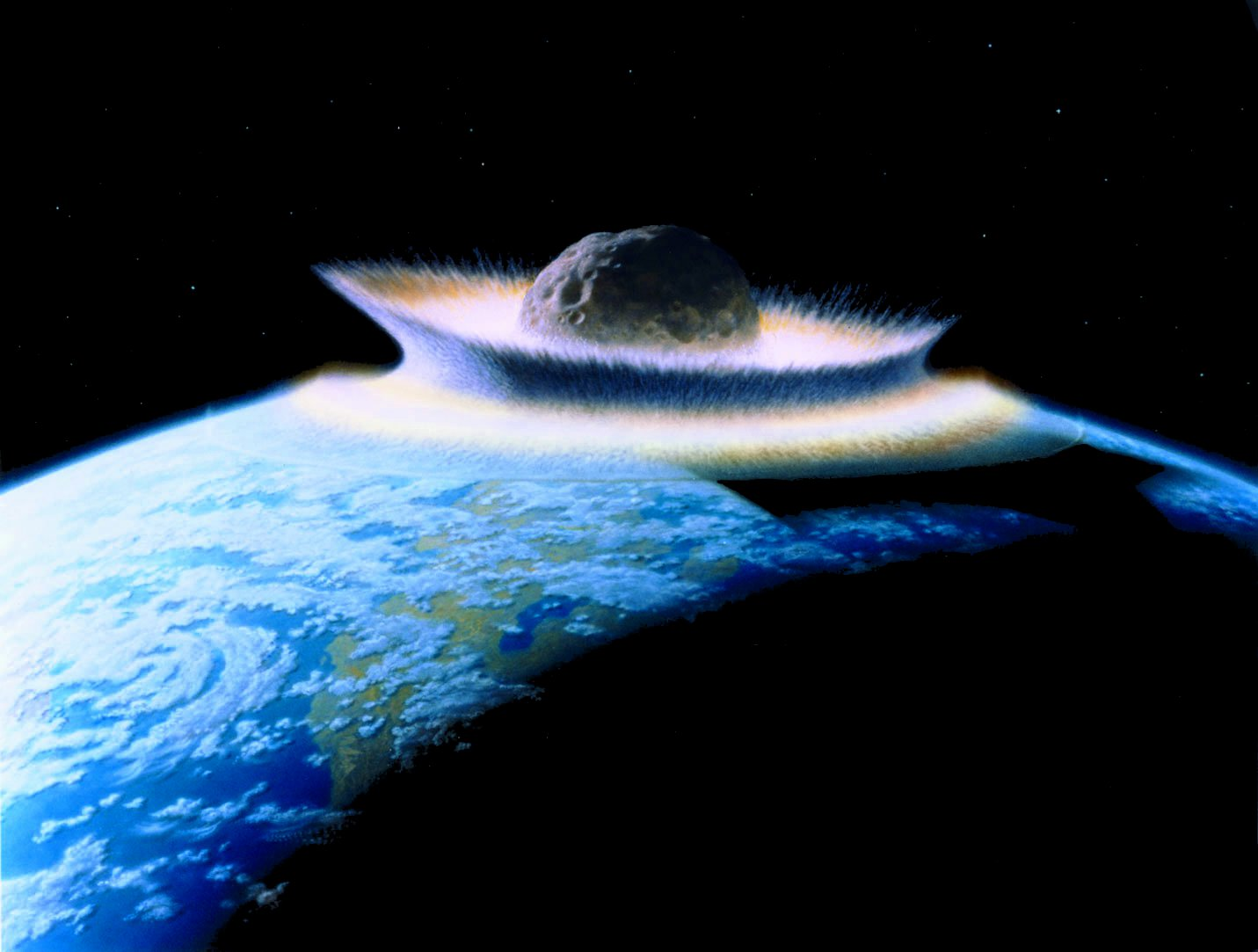
A planetoid plows onto the primordial Earth, example of impact event

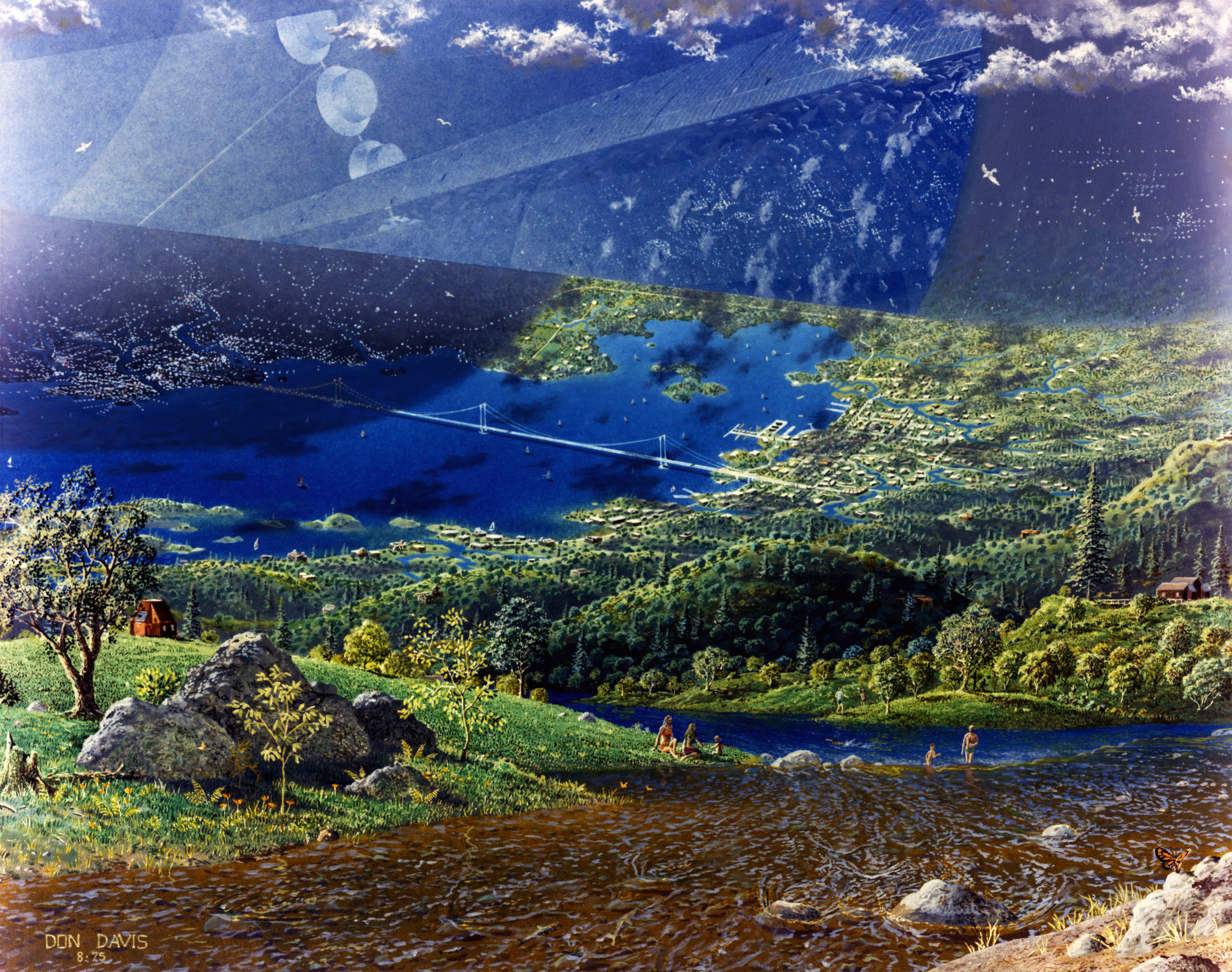
Interior of an Island Three space habitat

Don Davis (Donald E. Davis, born October 21, 1952) is an American space artist known for his portrayals of space-related subjects. His work is characterised by attention to detail and authentic portrayals based on what is known of the subject. Chesley Bonestell, considered by many to be one of the most accomplished practitioners of the space art genre, critiqued Davis' early paintings and encouraged him to pursue an artistic career.

Davis worked for the U. S. Geological Survey's branch of Astrogeologic Studies during the Apollo Lunar expeditions and has since painted many images for NASA. The NASA art included portrayals of interiors of giant space colonies, based on the work of Gerard O'Neill. He was part of the team of space artists gathered to provide the visual effects for the PBS series Cosmos by Carl Sagan. Later he painted the cover of Sagan's Pulitzer Prize–winning book The Dragons of Eden. Other books by Carl Sagan including Don's work are Comet and Pale Blue Dot.

Davis has made numerous paintings of impact events for publications and for NASA. In the early 1980s he created planetary texture maps for use in Jet Propulsion Laboratory computer graphic simulations of the Voyager encounters with the outer planets. During the 1980s and early 1990s Davis created models and film animations as part of the visual effects production teams for the PBS shows Planet Earth, Infinite Voyage, Space Age, and Life Beyond Earth with Timothy Ferris.

He painted and filmed in 35 mm an animation of the Galileo probe entry into Jupiter for NASA Ames. Numerous sequences for Discovery Channel science shows such as Savage Sun and Cosmic Safari were later created using computer graphic animation methods. Animations done in immersive hemispheric formats for planetarium type domed theaters now form the balance of his work.

Davis received an Emmy for his work on Cosmos, winning the 1981 Emmy for Outstanding Individual achievement in creative technical crafts. Also in 2002, the Klumpke-Roberts Award by the Astronomical Society of the Pacific for outstanding contributions to the public understanding and appreciation of astronomy. The asteroid 13330 Dondavis is named after him. In 2000 he was elected a Fellow in the International Association of Astronomical Artists.
