= Rotor (ride) =

Amusement park ride

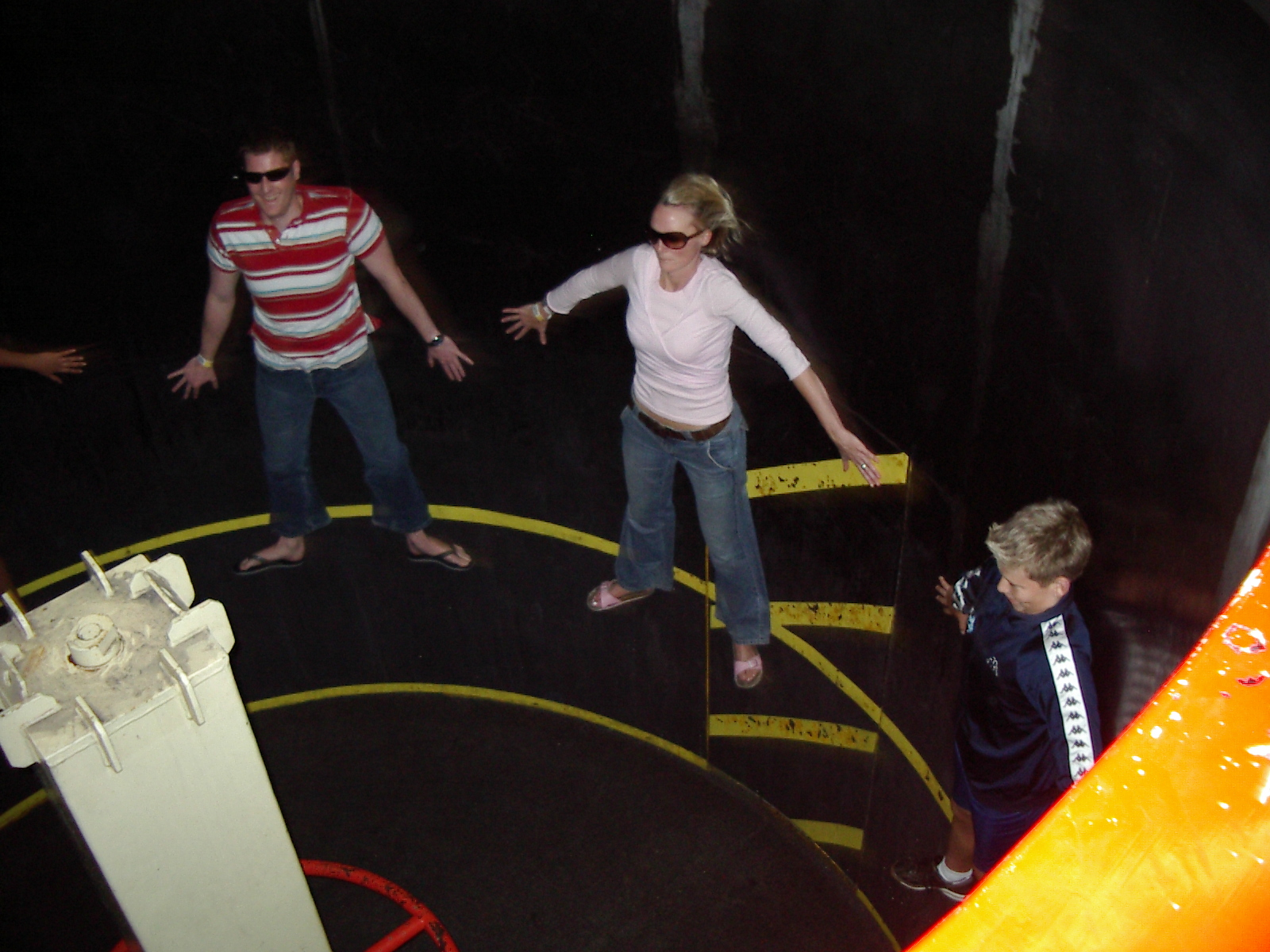
Interior of the Rotor at Luna Park Sydney. The ride is in mid-cycle, and the riders are stuck to the wall of the barrel by the force of friction combined with their inertia. The yellow lines on the barrel wall indicate the level the floor is at during different points of the ride; the higher line is level with the floor when the ride begins.

The Rotor is an amusement ride designed and patented by German engineer Ernst Hoffmeister in 1948. The ride was first demonstrated at Oktoberfest 1949 and still appears in numerous amusement parks. The Rotor is a large, upright barrel, rotated to create an inward acting centripetal force supplied by the wall's support's force. Once at full speed, the floor is retracted, leaving the riders stuck to the wall of the drum.

== History ==
The Rotor amusement ride was designed and patented by German engineer Ernst Hoffmeister in 1948. It was first demonstrated at Oktoberfest 1949, and was exhibited at fairs and events throughout Europe, during the 1950s and 1960s. The ride still appears in select amusement parks in Europe, although travelling variants have been surpassed by the Gravitron.

== Design and operation ==
Video of Finnish Fling operating at Worlds of Fun in 2015

The Rotor is a large, upright barrel, rotated at 33 revolutions per minute. The rotation of the barrel creates an inward acting centripetal force supplied by the wall's support's force, equivalent to almost 3 g. Once the barrel has attained full speed, the floor is retracted, leaving the riders stuck to the wall of the drum. At the end of the ride cycle, the drum slows down and gravity takes over. The riders slide down the wall slowly. Most Rotors were constructed with an observation deck.

Although Hoffmeister was the designer, most Rotors were constructed under license. In Australia, the Rotors were built by Ted Hopkins of Luna Park Milsons Point. In the United States, two main companies were responsible for production; the Velare Brothers and the Anglo Rotor Corporation. A dispute between these two companies was resolved when the construction rights to touring Rotors were assigned to the Velare Brothers, while permanent-standing Rotors (later becoming known as Chance Rotors) became the domain of ARC.

== Appearances ==
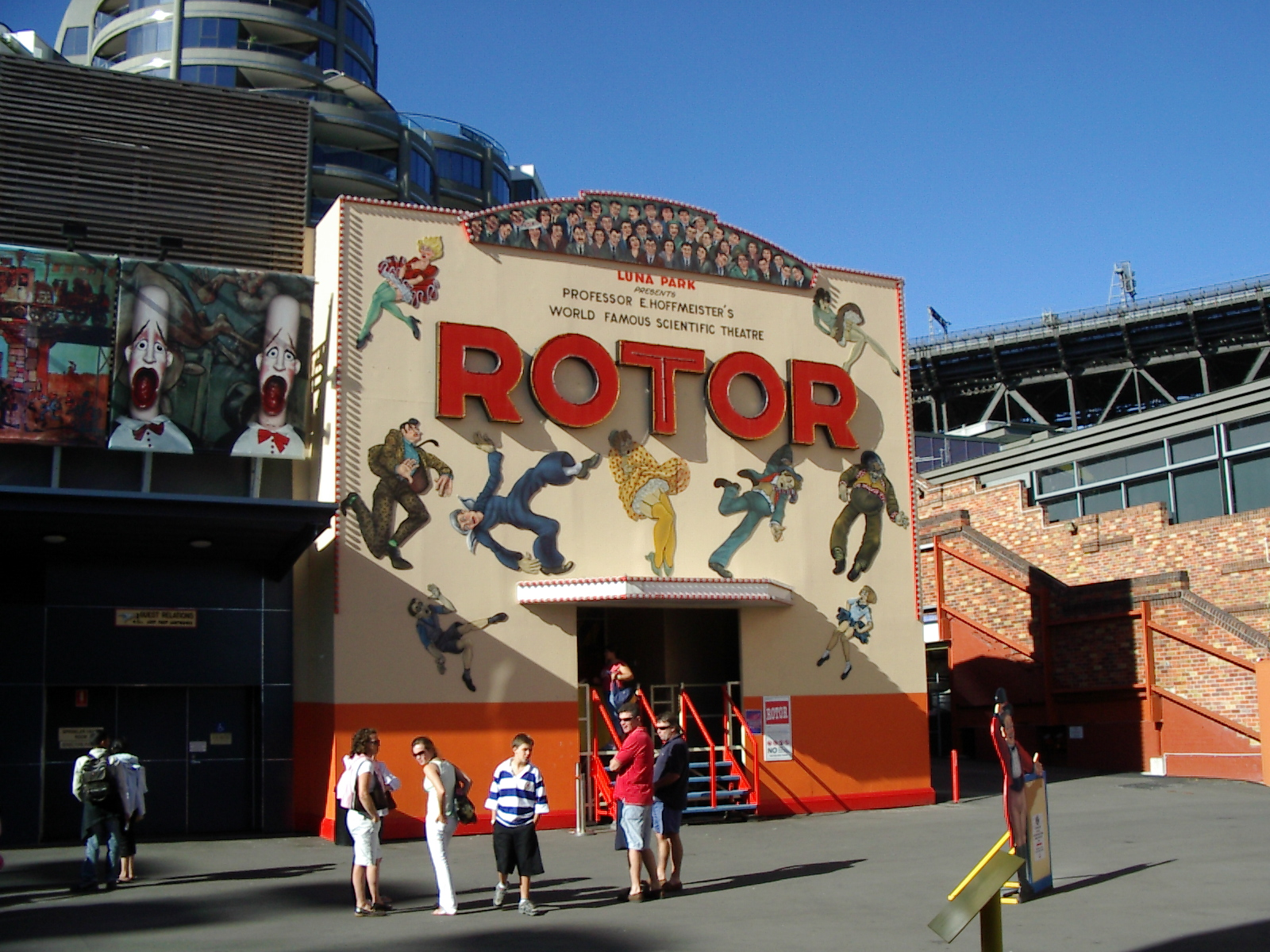
Facade of Rotor at Luna Park Sydney

- Australia – Three Rotors were built in Australia based on Hoffmeister's design. All had been demolished or destroyed by the 1990s, although a slightly redesigned Rotor was rebuilt for Luna Park Sydney in 1995, which is still in operation.
- United States – Several Rotors have been constructed in the United States, since the 1960s. There is only one known fixed location Rotor currently in operation in the United States, which is an SDC Model ride. It operates at Canobie Lake Park in Salem, New Hampshire ("Turkish Twist"). A standard Chance model Rotor still stands at Sylvan Beach Amusement Park in Sylvan Beach, New York, but has not operated since the 2018 season. A traveling Chance Rotor travels with Kissel Entertainment, but no longer features the dropping floor.

=== Past appearances ===
- Adventureland (Known as "Silly Silo", active 1974 – 2013), Altoona, Iowa
- AstroWorld (known as the "Barrel of Fun" 1971 – 1979), Houston, Texas
- Battersea Fun Fair, London
- Boblo Island (circa 1980s), Ontario, Canada
- Canadian National Exhibition (circa 1980's), Toronto, Ontario
- Carowinds (1973-1980s, known as "The Oaken Bucket")
- Cedar Point (circa 1960s – circa 1970s), Sandusky, Ohio
- Coney Island (1970 – 1971), Cincinnati, Ohio
- Conneaut Lake Park (known as the "Hell Hole" 1976 – 1992), Conneaut Lake, Pennsylvania
- COSI Columbus (1999 – 2011), Columbus, Ohio
- Crystal Beach Park (circa 1960s), west of Fort Erie, Ontario
- Elitch Gardens (known as the "Mine Shaft" 1989 – 1998), Denver, Colorado
- Euclid Beach Park [1957 – 1969] [Cleveland], Ohio
- Fantasy Island (known as "Devil's Hole" active 1975 – 1993), Grand Island, New York
- Frontier City (relocated from Six Flags Over Texas, known as the Terrible Twister from 1992 to 2014, when it was renamed Tumbleweed. 1992 – 2019)
- Geauga Lake (1981 – 1999), Aurora, Ohio
- Great Escape (1983 – circa 1990s) Queensbury, New York
- Hersheypark (1970 – 1994), Hershey, Pennsylvania
- Kennywood – three different rides (1955 – 1958; 1965 – 1972; 1988 – 1994), West Mifflin, Pennsylvania
- Kings Dominion Time Shaft (1979 – 1995), Doswell, Virginia
- Kings Island (1972 – 1982), Mason, Ohio
- Lagoon Amusement Park (1972 – circa 1990), Farmington, Utah
- Lake Compounce (closed in 2010), Bristol, Connecticut
- Lakeside Amusement Park (1990s – 2005), Denver, Colorado
- Nottingham Goose Fair (Mid 1950s to mid 1970s)
- Old Chicago (1975 – 1980), Bolingbrook, Illinois
- Old Indiana (circa 1980s?), Thorntown, Indiana
- Pacific Ocean Park (1960 – 1967) Santa Monica, California
- Palace Playland (closed circa mid-1990s), Old Orchard Beach, Maine
- Paragon Park (closed 1984), Nantasket Beach, Hull, Massachusetts
- The Pike (circa 1960s – 1979 opened as "Rotor", Long Beach, California
- Playland Amusement Park (circa 1970s) Ocean City, Maryland
- Pontchartrain Beach (1963 – 1983), New Orleans, Louisiana
- Riverview Park (Chicago) (1952–1967)
- Six Flags Great Adventure (1975-2005), Jackson Township, New Jersey "Great Adventure History: Rotor at Six Flags Great Adventure". Great Adventure History.
- Six Flags Great America (known as Cajun Cliffhanger, opened 1976 and closed in 2000 due to an accident when two girls were injured on the ride, Gurnee, Illinois.)
- Six Flags Magic Mountain (1971 – 2008 "Spin-out" custom wood enclosure and observation deck), Valencia, California
- Six Flags New England (removed after 1998 season), Agawam, Massachusetts
- Six Flags Over Georgia Was called the "Spindle Top" (removed), Atlanta, Georgia
- Six Flags Over Texas "Spindletop" (1967 – 1989), Arlington, Texas
- Six Flags St. Louis (Known as "Tom's Twister" active 1972 – 2005), Eureka, Missouri
- Wicksteed Park, Kettering, Northamptonshire
- Worlds of Fun (Known as "Finnish Fling", active 1973 – 2017), Kansas City, Missouri

==== In popular culture ====
- A scene in The 400 Blows depicts Antoine Doinel (Jean-Pierre Léaud) riding a Rotor. Director François Truffaut is among the other riders.
- The 2006 film Candy's opening scene features actors Abbie Cornish and Heath Ledger riding the Rotor in Sydney's Luna Park, while actor Geoffrey Rush watches them from above.
- In the 1976 television series Charlie's Angels, the heroines capture a criminal by trapping him into a Rotor ride and turning it on; as such, he became stuck to the wall and couldn't escape.
- In the season 4 The Cleveland Show episode "Spins, Pins, and Fins!", after breaking into an abandoned amusement park, Cleveland, Lester, Holt, and Tim become trapped while riding the park's Rotor after Lester, who was supposed to be operating the ride, jumps into the ride to join the rest of his friends.

== See also ==
- Gravitron
- Round Up (ride)
- O'Neill cylinder

== Sources ==
- Marshall, Sam (2005). Luna Park – Just for fun (2nd ed.). Sydney, Australia: Luna Park Sydney Pty Ltd. ISBN 0-646-44807-2.
- Historical information boards located at Luna Park Sydney
- François Truffaut's The 400 Blows (1959)
