= Cajun Cliffhanger =

Defunct amusement ride

Six Flags Great America
- Area: Orleans Place
- Status: Removed
- Opening date: 1976
- Closing date: 2000
- Replaced by: Jester's Wild Ride; The Joker

Ride statistics
- Attraction type: rotor
- Manufacturer: Chance Morgan
- Model: Rotor
- Vehicles: 1

The Cajun Cliffhanger was a rotor-type amusement ride at Six Flags Great America. and was one of the earliest Chance Industries Rotors produced. Due to the popularity of a Velare Rotor Ride at Chicago's Riverview Park, which closed in 1967, a similar ride made by Chance was purchased by Six Flags, for Marriott's Great America when it opened in 1976 and was called the Cajun Cliffhanger.

The ride was a large circular room with felt-lined walls that passengers entered through a door and took a position freely standing against the wall. The door would be closed and the room would begin to rotate. When the rate of rotation was sufficient, the floor would drop a few feet, leaving the riders pinned to the wall by inertia.

On July 19, 2000, two girls, aged 11 and 13, were injured on the ride. Both girls sustained injuries to their feet; at least one had broken bones. The girls' feet were caught between the moving floor and the wall. Witnesses reported the floor was raised at the wrong time. The ride model was also known to create a gap between the wall and floor over time from wear. After inquiries found the operators negligent, they were fined $1,000. The ride remained closed until it was demolished and scrapped during the 2001 off-season. The Joker is currently operating in its place.
