= Suomen Tivoli =

Traveling carnival in Finland

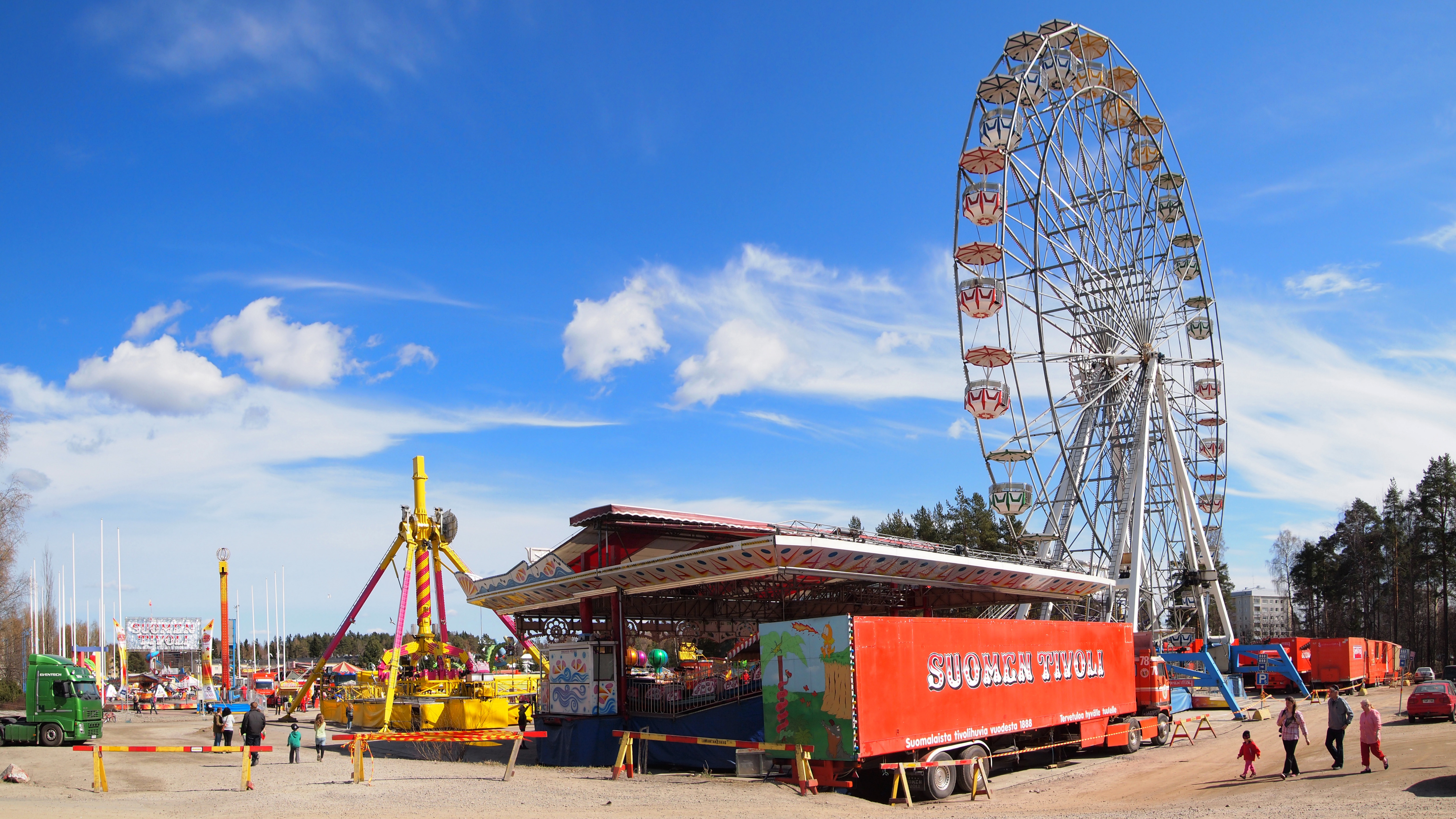
- Suomen Tivoli in Jyväskylä in April 2014.
- Location: Finland
- Status: Defunct
- Opened: 1888
- Closed: 2026
- Operating season: April to September

Attractions
- Total: 27
- Roller coasters: 2
- Website: www.suomentivoli.fi

Suomen Tivoli (lit. 'Carnival of Finland') was the largest traveling carnival in Finland. As of 2026, it contained 27 rides and was visited by some 300,000 visitors yearly.

The carnival's history dates back to 1888, when Johan Grönroos set up a carnival in Kerava. Grönroos expanded the business into a circus in 1898, and purchased what was likely the first movie projector in Finland in 1899. The family name was changed to Sariola by Johan's son, J. A. F. Grönroos in 1918. Sariola's carnival soon grew into four different traveling sections, of which Tivoli Sariola is the only one remaining active.

The carnival ceased operations in 2026 due to long-standing financial difficulties, after having operated for 138 years.
