= Centrifuge Accommodations Module =

Cancelled element of the International Space Station

Coordinates: 36°3′52.67″N 140°7′33.09″E

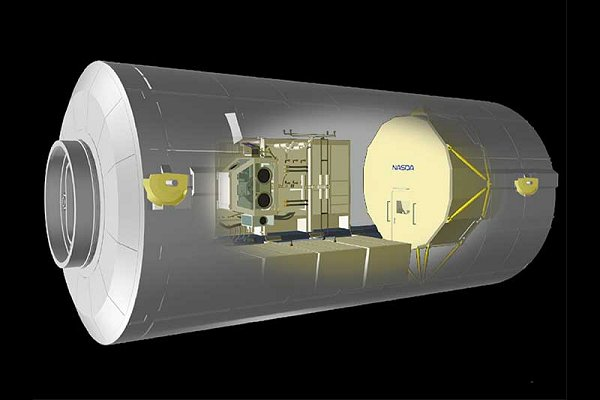
ISS Centrifuge Accommodations Module

The Centrifuge Accommodations Module (CAM) is a cancelled element of the International Space Station (ISS). Although the module was planned to contain several parts, the 2.5 m (8.2 ft) centrifuge still was considered the most important capability of the module.

== History ==
The centrifuge would have provided controlled acceleration rates (artificial gravity) for experiments and the capability to:

- Expose a variety of biological specimens that are less than 24.5 in (0.62 m) tall to artificial gravity levels between 0.01g and 2g.
- Simultaneously provide two different artificial gravity levels.
- Provide partial g and hyper g environment for specimens to investigate altered gravity effects and g-thresholds.
- Provide short duration and partial g and hyper g environment for specimens to investigate temporal effects of gravity exposure.
- Provide Earth simulation environment on ISS to isolate microgravity effects on specimens.
- Provide Earth simulation environment on ISS to allow specimens to recover from microgravity effects.
- Provide in situ 1g controls for specimens in micro-gravity.

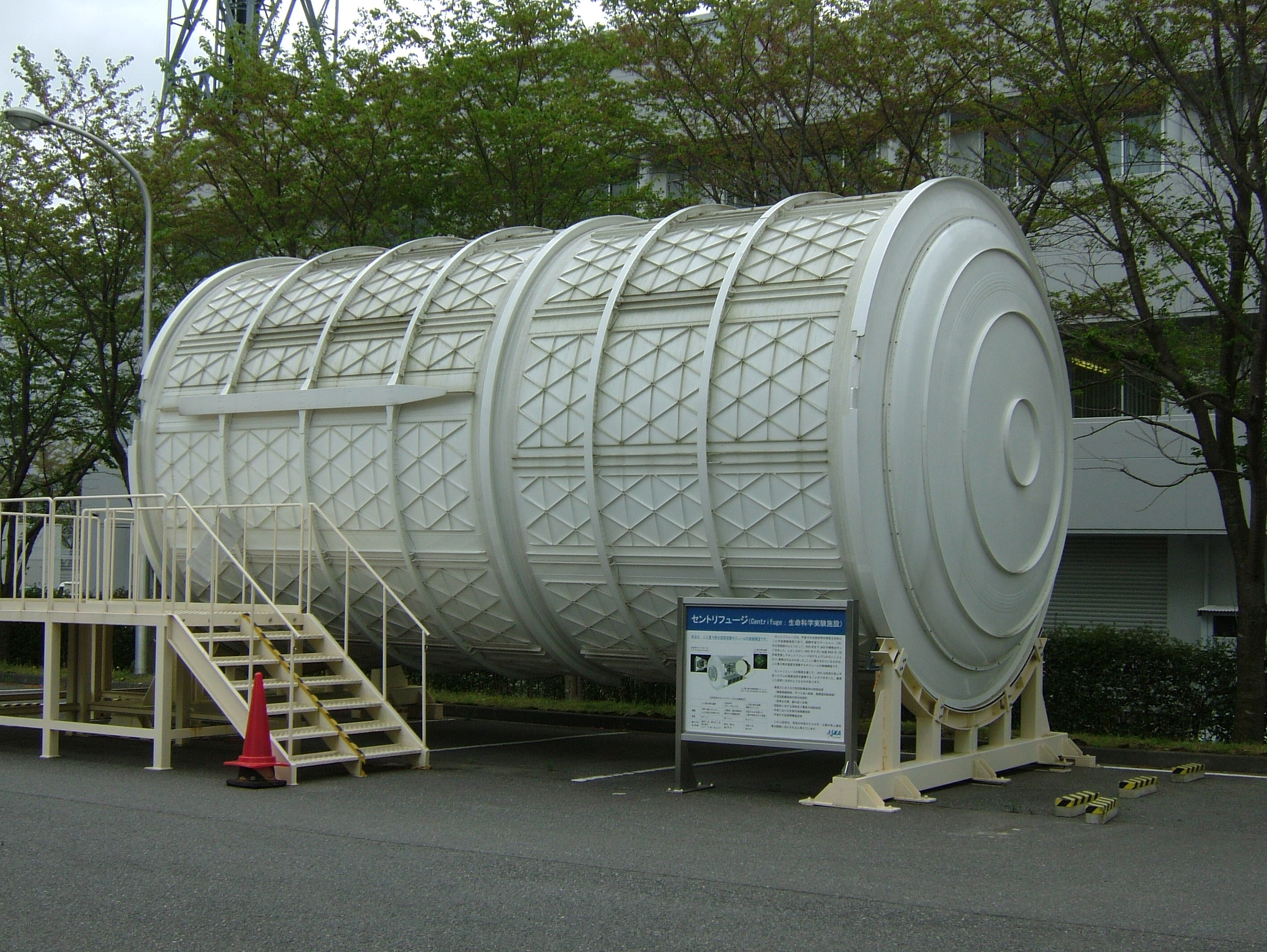
The partly built shell of the Centrifuge Accommodations Module at Tsukuba (Japan)

It was built by JAXA's predecessor, NASDA, but owned by NASA, who obtained ownership of the CAM by trading in a free launch of the Japanese Experiment Module Kibo to the ISS. The CAM flight model along with the engineering model of the centrifuge rotor were manufactured. The CAM would have been attached to the zenith port on the Harmony module of the ISS.

It was cancelled in 2005 alongside the Habitation Module and the Crew Return Vehicle, because of ISS cost overruns and scheduling problems in Space Shuttle assembly flights.

It is now on display in an outdoor exhibit at the Tsukuba Space Center in Japan.

== See also ==
- Artificial gravity
- Space adaptation syndrome
- Space colonization
- Nautilus-X#ISS centrifuge demonstration

== External ==
- Centrifuge, Japan Aerospace Exploration Agency (JAXA)
