= Rotating wheel space station =

Space station concept

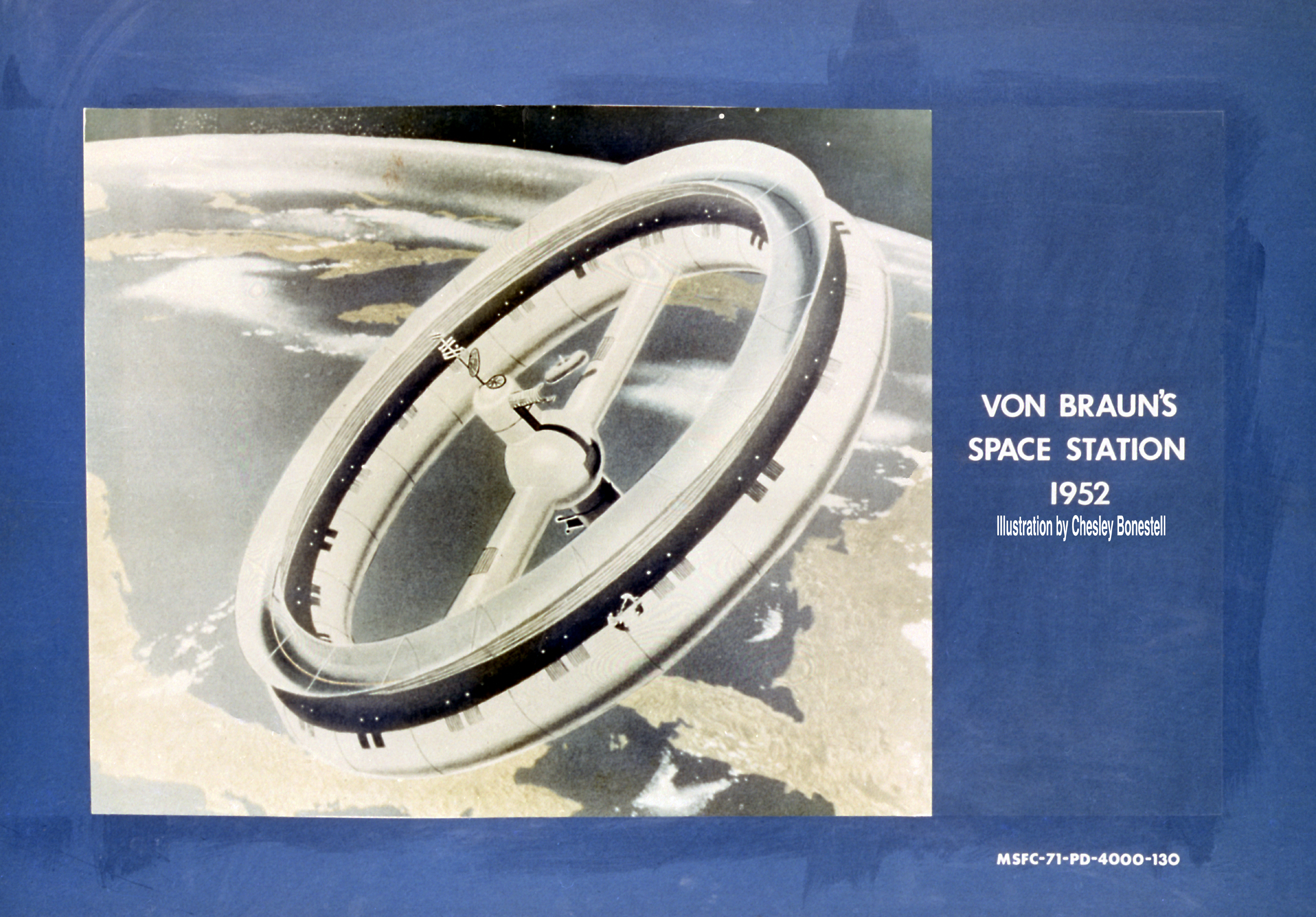
Rotating wheel space station concept by Wernher von Braun (illustration by Chesley Bonestell, 1952).

A rotating wheel space station is a concept for a hypothetical wheel-shaped space station that rotates to produce artificial gravity. It was originally proposed by Herman Potočnik in 1929, which was adapted by Wernher von Braun in 1952 (the von Braun wheel), and subsequently popularized. Eventually the seminal film 2001: A Space Odyssey (1968) featured a now iconic rotating wheel space station (Space Station V). From 1960-1962 NASA developed a 24-foot prototype of a wheel station, the Erectable Torus Manned Space Laboratory, and a 150ft concept, the Erectable Modular Space Station, that were both cancelled. No recent development of such a space station has been realized or demonstrated, as proposed with the Nautilus-X International Space Station centrifuge demonstrator.

== Specifications ==
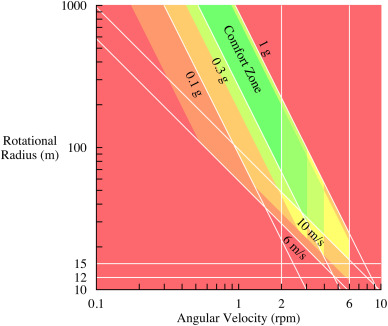
Comfort chart for artificial gravity by rotation (shades illustrate zones of disagreement in the science literature)

This type of station rotates about its axis, creating an environment of artificial gravity. Occupants of the station would experience centrifugal acceleration, according to the following equation:

$$a = -\omega^2 r$$

where $\omega$ is the angular velocity of the station, $r$ is its radius, and $a$ is linear acceleration at any point along its perimeter.

In theory, the station could be configured to simulate the gravitational acceleration of Earth (9.81 m/s^{2}), allowing for human long stays in space without the drawbacks of microgravity.

== History ==
Science fiction writers have thought of space stations since 1869 (The Brick Moon), scientist since Konstantin Tsiolkovsky's space station concepts from 1883, and rotating spacecraft for artificial gravity since 1891 (Hermann Ganswindt).

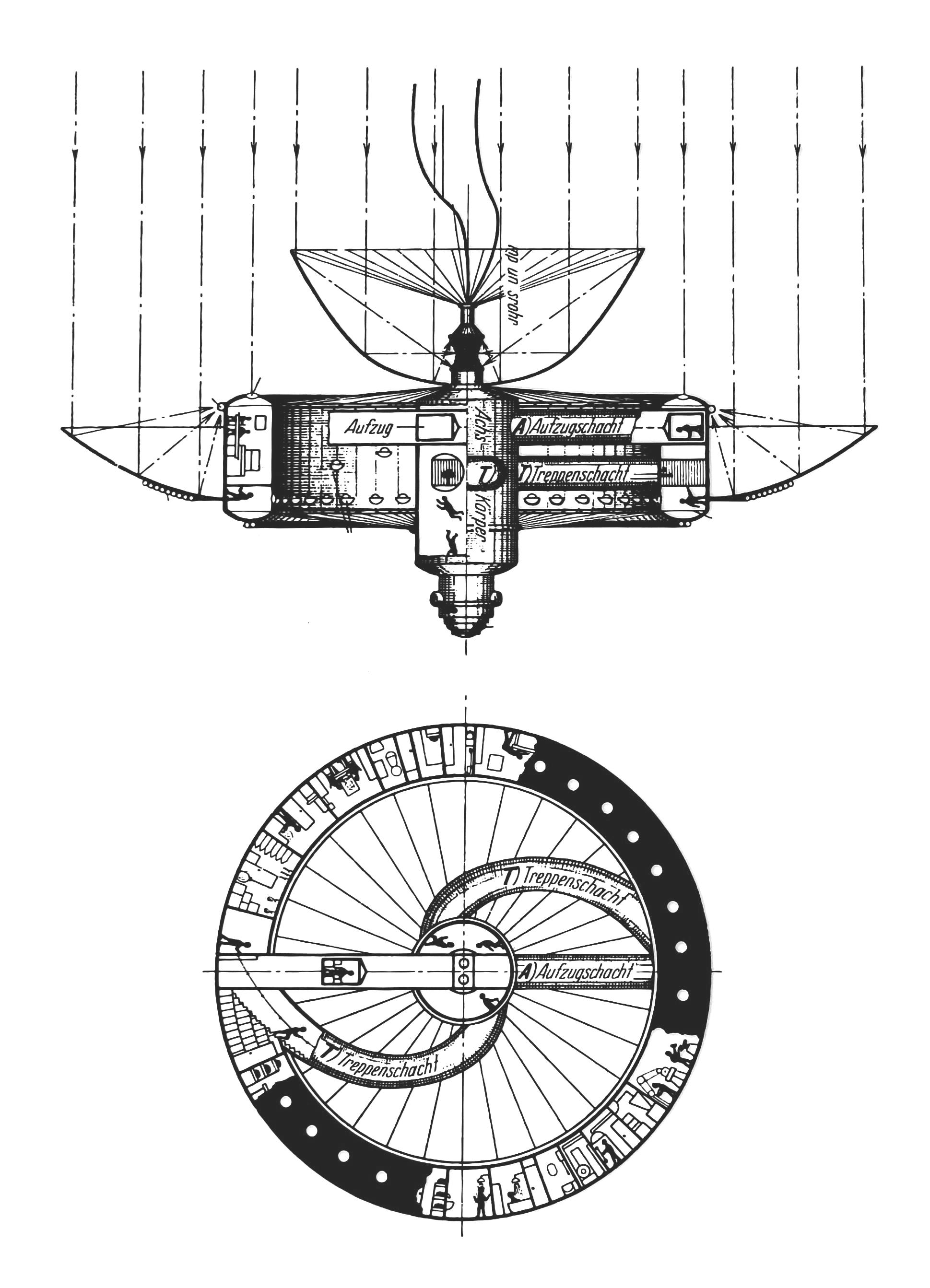
Depiction of the first detailed description and drawings of a rotating wheel space station (The Problem of Space Travel - Vienna, 1928) by Herman Potočnik, also known as Hermann Noordung, which inspired later designs

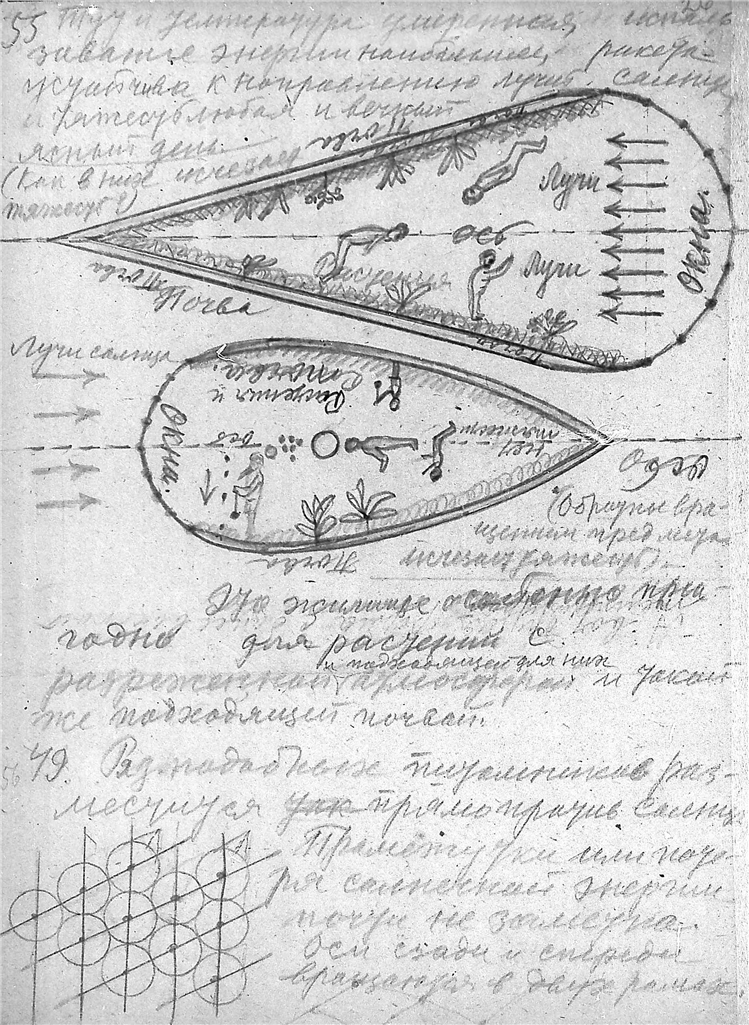
A drawing of people floating in an orbital rotating greenhouse by Konstantin Tsiolkovsky (1933)

Herman Potočnik produced the first detailed description of a spinning wheel station with a 30-meter diameter, in his Problem der Befahrung des Weltraums (The Problem of Space Travel). He even suggested it be placed in a geostationary orbit, and before photovoltaics were known designing the station with large concave mirrors to collect sunlight for producing electricity. In 1952, Wernher von Braun and Willy Ley, writing in Colliers Magazine, updated the idea, in part as a way to stage spacecraft headed for Mars. They envisioned a rotating wheel with a diameter of 76 meters (250 feet). The 3-deck wheel would revolve at 3 RPM to provide artificial one-third gravity. It was envisaged as having a crew of 80.

In the Soviet Union Tsiolkovsky drew in 1933 a rotating green house and described a rotating toroidal ring space station. The green house was depicted as a cylindrical station by Boris Valeryanovich Lyapunov in 1950. A wheel shaped station was illustrated in 1951 (drawn by Nikolai Kolchitsky, and in 1952 published in Journey into Tomorrow by Vasily Zakharchenko), which later was related to Tsiolkovsky's concept.

In 1959, a NASA committee opined that such a space station was the next logical step after the Mercury program. In 1960 they began development on the Erectable Torus Manned Space Laboratory, building two prototypes before the project was cancelled due to fear of a puncture or the station tumbling out of control. It would have launched on a Mercury-Atlas 3 and inflate to 24 feet in diameter. Addressing the Torus' design limitations NASA also studied the Erectable Modular Space Station which would have been larger, more dynamically stable, and made of modulus that could be sealed in the event of a puncture, but was did not see further funding after a positive 1962 feasibility study due to the consolation of resources around Project Apollo. The Stanford torus, proposed by NASA in 1975, is an enormous version of the same concept that could harbor an entire city.

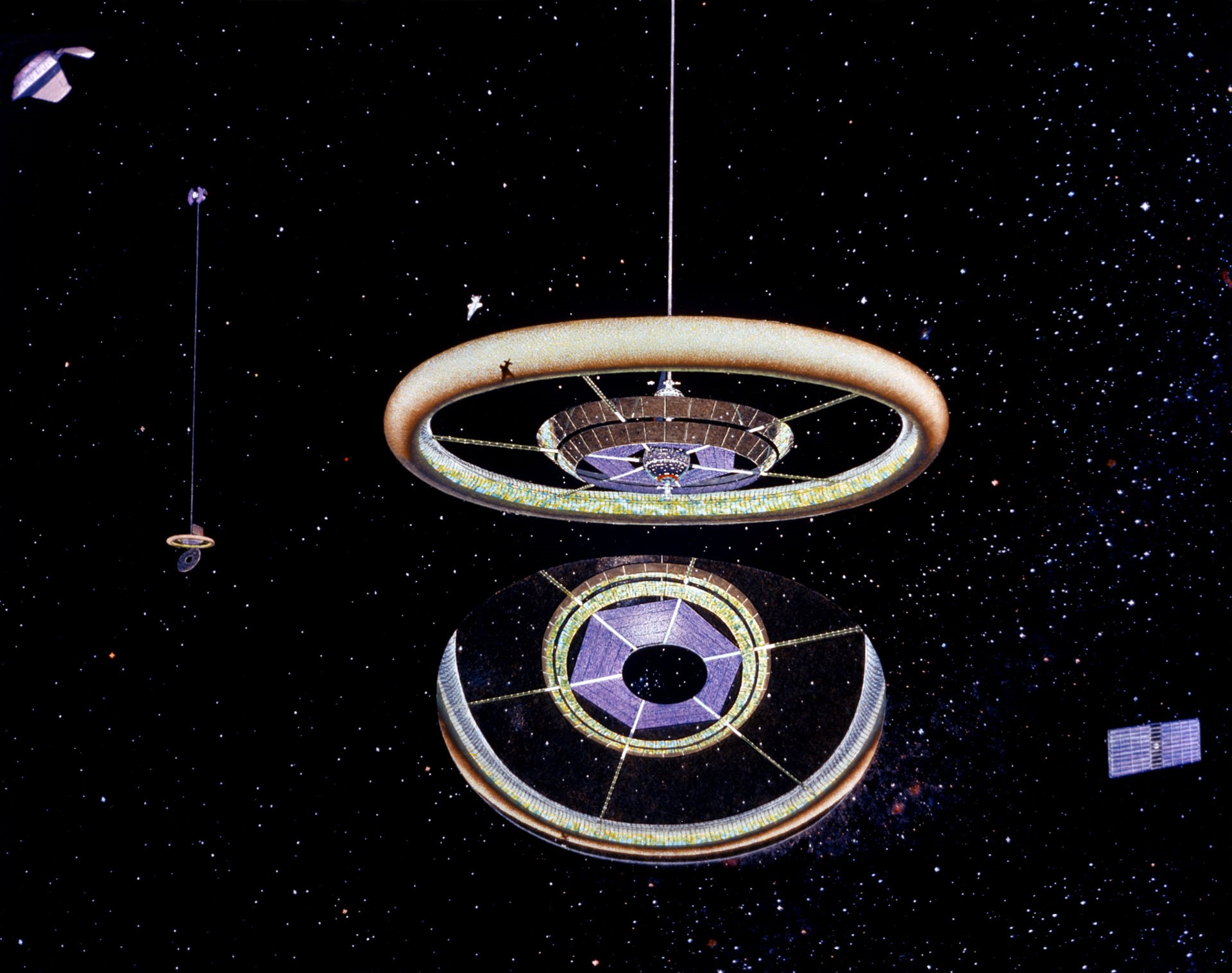
1975 NASA concept of a Stanford torus

In the 2010s, NASA explored plans for a Nautilus X centrifuge demonstration project. If flown, this would have added a centrifuge sleep quarters module to the ISS. This would have allowed experimentation with artificial gravity without destroying the usefulness of the ISS for zero g experiments, and would have been the first in-space demonstration of sufficient scale for artificial partial-g effects. The project did not advance beyond initial drawings and proposal.

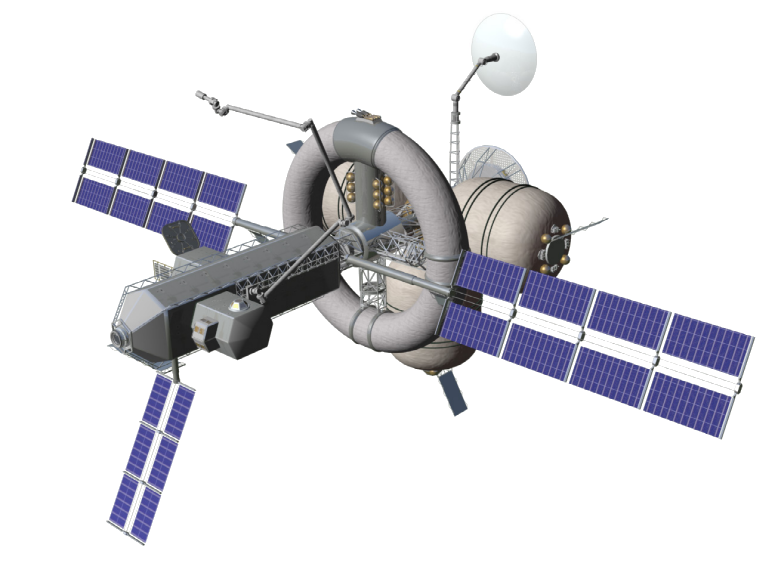
Proposed Nautilus-X

=== Current considerations ===
NASA has not attempted to build a rotating wheel space station, for several reasons. First, such a station would be difficult to construct, given the limited lifting capability available to the United States and other spacefaring nations. Assembling such a station and pressurizing it would present formidable obstacles, which, although not beyond NASA's technical capability, would be beyond available budgets. Second, NASA considers the present space station, the International Space Station (ISS), to be valuable as a zero gravity laboratory, and its current microgravity environment was a conscious choice.

== Gallery ==
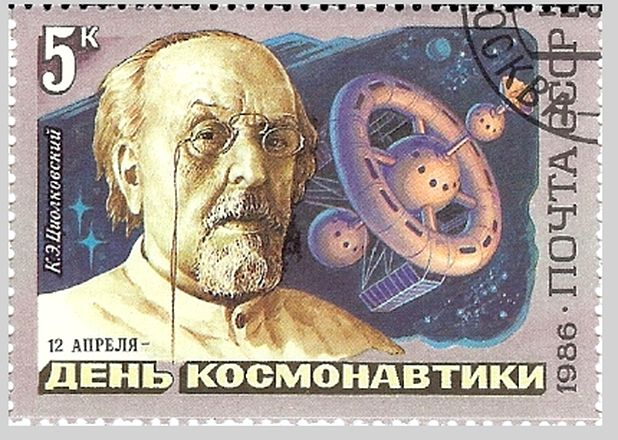
A stamp from 1986 depicting Tsiolkovsky with a bublik like station drawn by cosmonaut and artist Alexey Leonov and Andrei Sokolov in 1972 and based on a model at the Tsiolkovsky Museum in Kaluga.

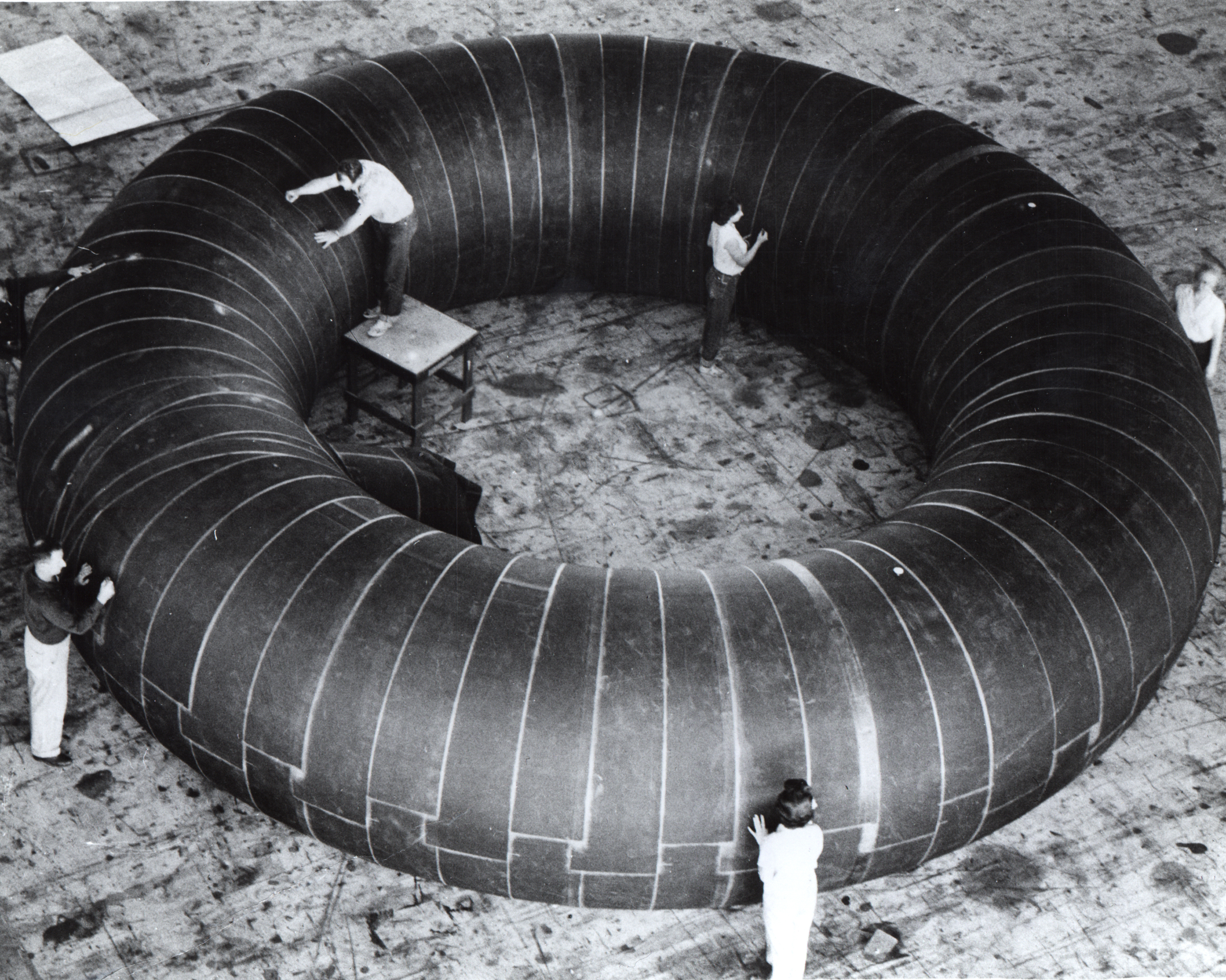
NASA engineers working on the Erectable Torus Manned Space Laboratory

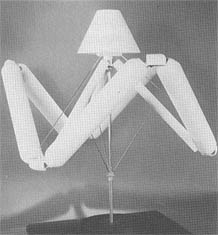
1962 NASA concept of the Erectable Modular Space Station

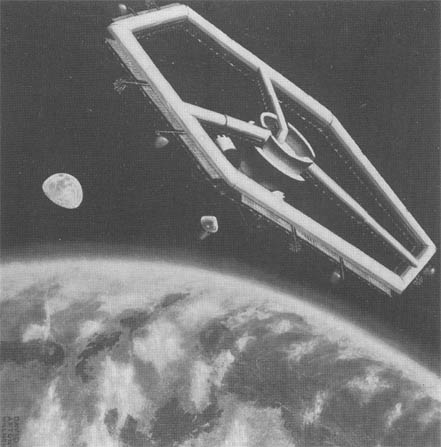
1962 NASA concept of the Erectable Modular Space Station

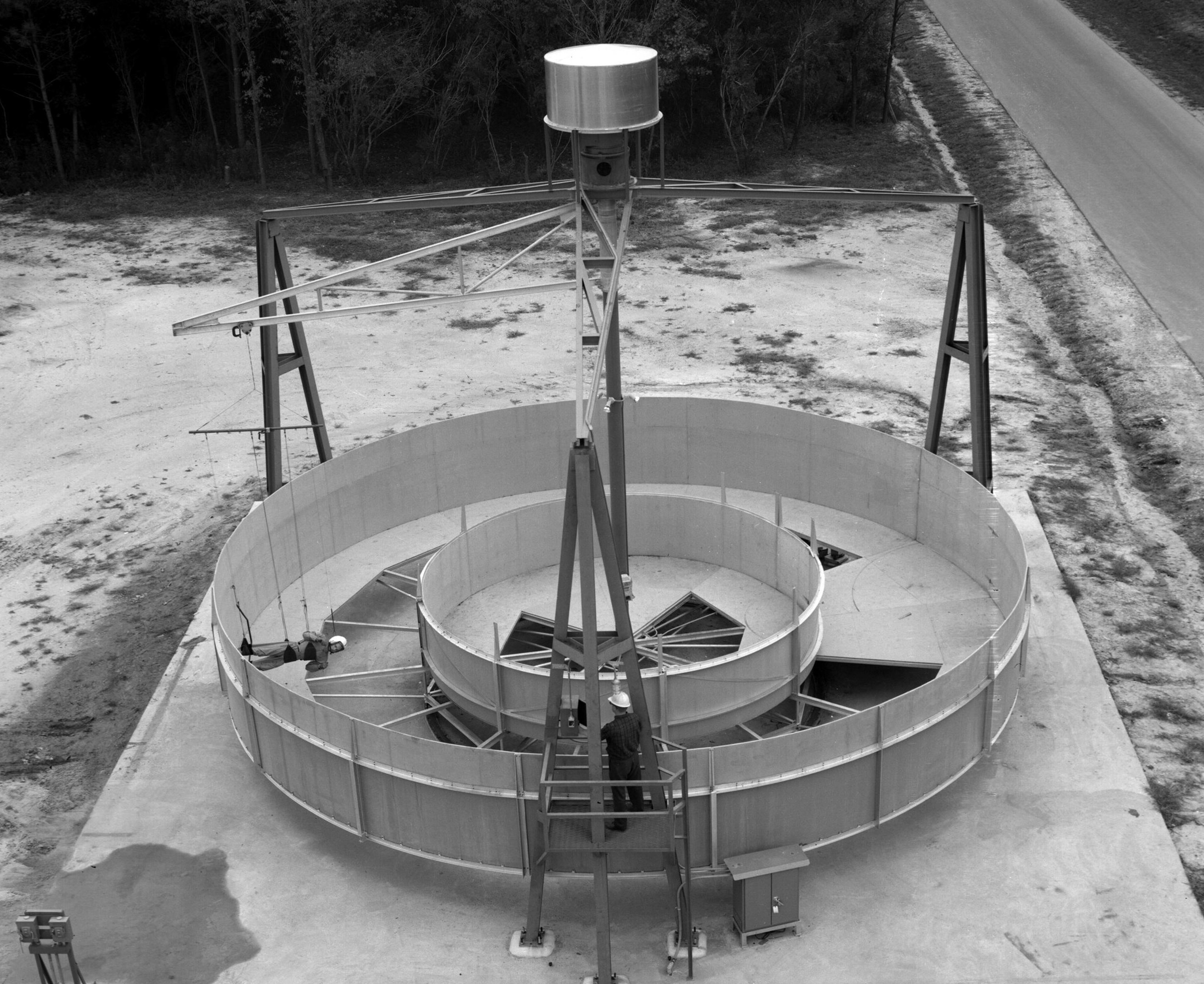
A NASA engineer takes a walk in simulated zero gravity around a mock-up of a full-scale, 7.3 m (24 ft) diameter space station in 1964.

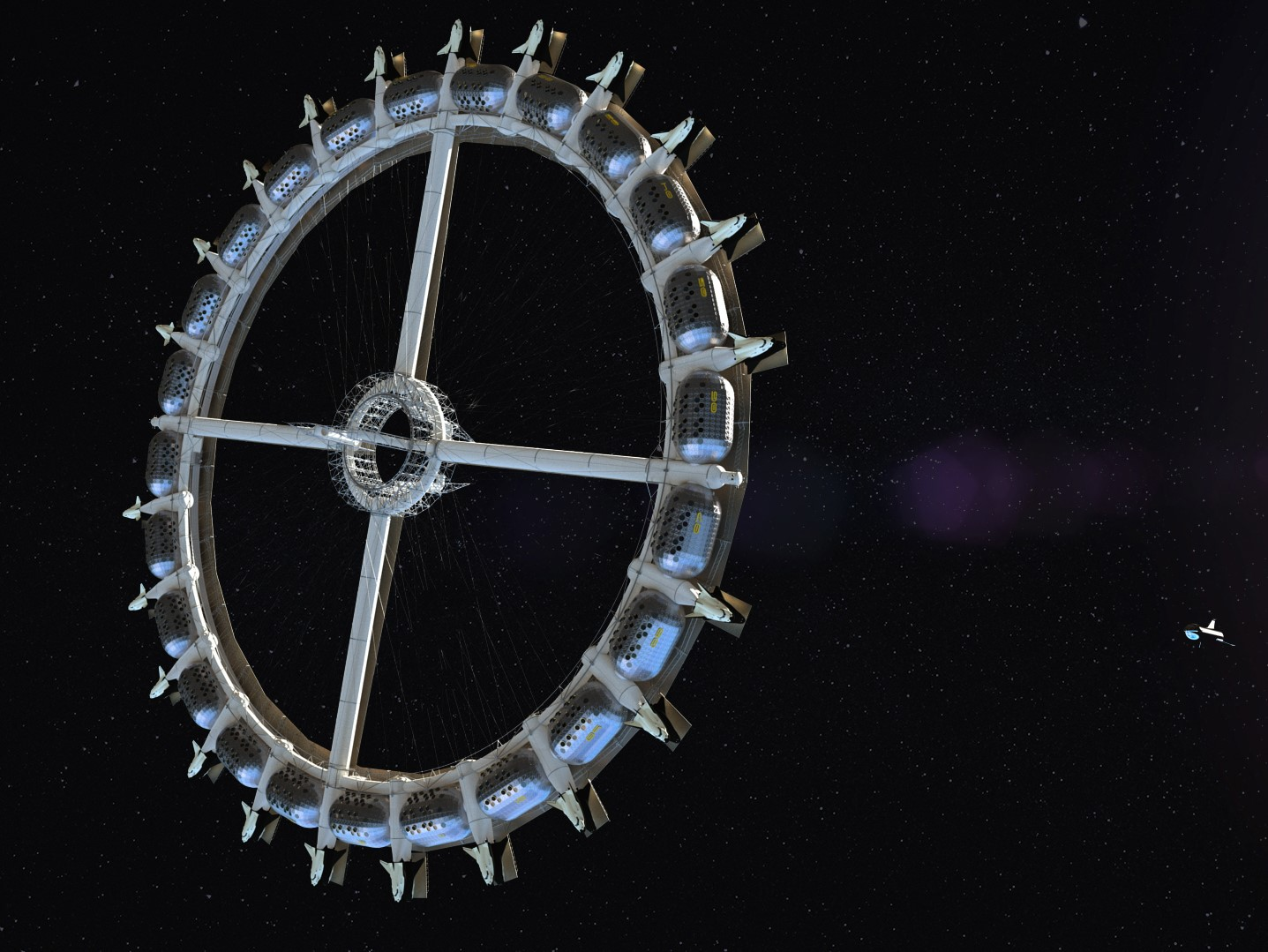
2019 conceptual rendering of the proposed Voyager Space Station, in development by Orbital Assembly Corporation

== In fiction ==
Many fictional space stations and spacecraft use a rotating design.

=== Rotating wheel stations ===
1936: In Alexander Belyaev's novel KETs Star, a circular space station provides pseudo-gravity of about 0.1 g by its rotation.

1958: The film Queen of Outer Space features a rotating space station that gets blown up.

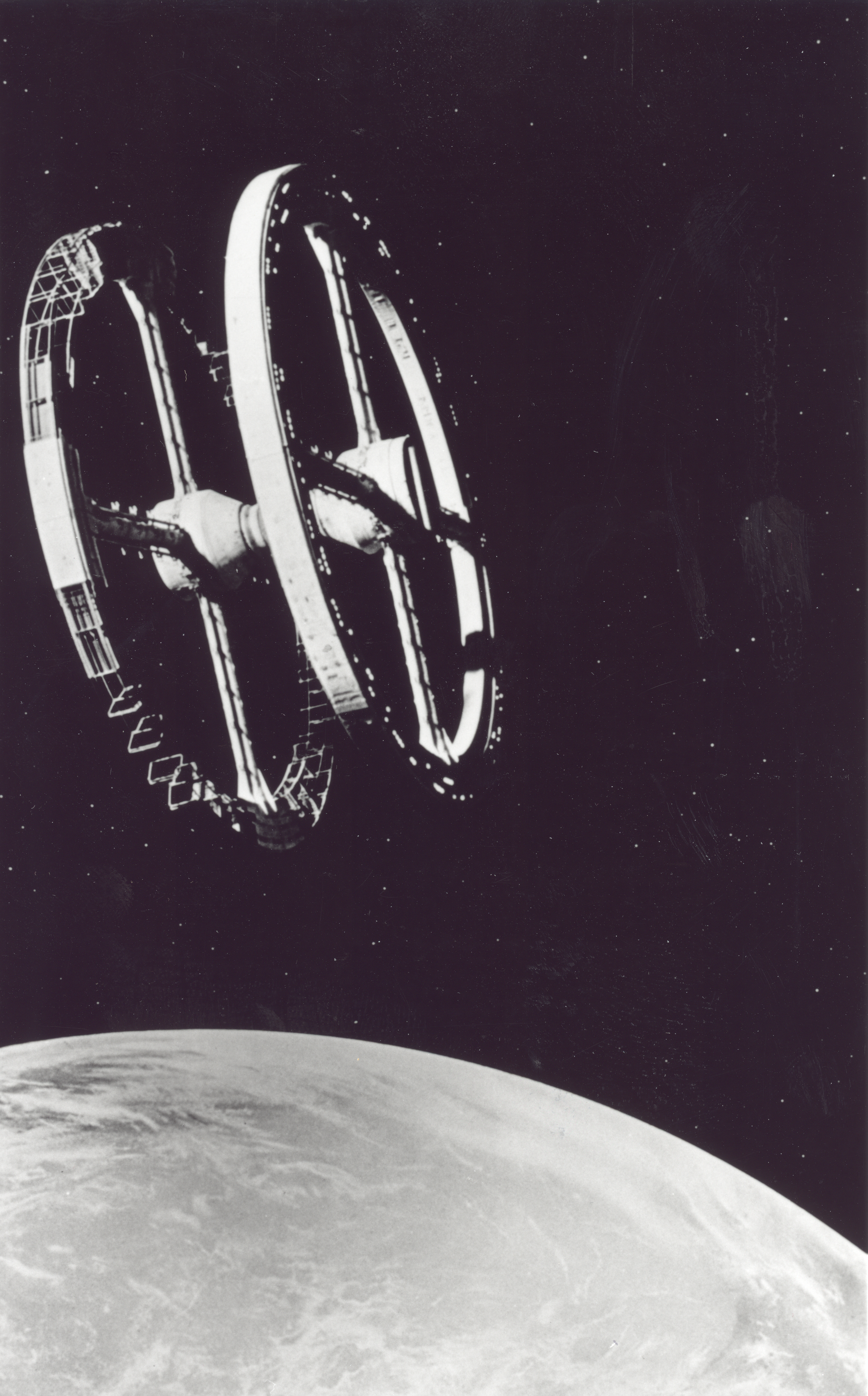
The rotating Space Station V of the film 2001: A Space Odyssey

1968: Arthur C. Clarke's novel 2001: A Space Odyssey was developed concurrently with Stanley Kubrick's film version of the same name. In it, the rotating Space Station V provides artificial gravity and features prominently on the book's first-edition cover. The Jupiter mission spacecraft Discovery One features a centrifuge for the crew living quarters that provides artificial gravity.

1968: In the six part Doctor Who TV serial The Wheel in Space, the titular station is the main setting of the story.

1985: The novel Ender's Game features a multi-ringed station called "Battle School" with varying levels of simulated gravity. As the characters move through the station towards the center, there is a noticeable decline in the feeling of gravity.

1993: The computer game Frontier: Elite 2 and its sequels feature rotating wheel stations. They and their predecessor Elite also feature other, non-wheel designs that produce artificial gravity by rotating.

1999: The main story of the Japanese manga and anime Planetes is set in "The Seven", the seventh wheel orbital station, and a ninth is under construction by 2075.

2003: In the re-imagined series Battlestar Galactica. Ragnar Anchorage is a three-ringed weapons storage station, and the civilian ship Zephyr is a luxury liner featuring a ringed midsection.

2007: The "Presidium" sector of the Citadel space station in the Mass Effect series of video games comprises a rotating toroidal section connected to a docking ring, with five large "wards" radiating out from the central ring like a flower's petals. In addition, Arcturus Station, the human seat of government on the galactic stage (not shown in the games, but described in detail), is also mentioned as being a rotating Stanford torus.

2010: In the OVA Mobile Suit Gundam Unicorn, the official residence for the prime minister of the Earth Federation "Laplace" is an example of a Stanford torus.

2011: Most space stations in the novel series The Expanse make use of artificial gravity by rotation, most notably Tycho Station. Even larger celestial objects like Ceres and Eros have been hollowed out and spun up to generate gravitational pull for their inhabitants.

2015: Thunderbird 5 in the ITV TV show Thunderbirds Are Go features a rotating gravity ring section on the space station which features a glass floor to observe the Earth below. The series is set in the year 2060.

2018: The video game Fallout 76 includes a ruined space station that has a rotating wheel on it in a location called The Crater.

2019: The video game Outer Wilds features multiple: the base game contains a rotating gravity wheel inside of a planet to maintain a gravitational pull within the planet's center. The 2021 DLC Echoes of the Eye features a planet-sized, wheel-shaped starship that rotates to create artificial gravity.

2022: The Mandalorian is shown on a rotating ring with artificial gravity in The Book of Boba Fett.

2022: The season 3 premiere of For All Mankind, an Apple TV+ original series, depicts a space hotel with a rotating wheel for gravity generation which becomes important to the storyline after the rotating mechanism malfunctions.

2022: The computer game Ixion centers around a mobile rotating wheel station named Tiqqun, with an FTL drive named Ixion, after the divine punishment exacted on the mythological king Ixion (being bound to a flying, spinning wheel).

=== Rotating wheel spacecraft ===
1966: Larry Niven's short story "The Warriors" (published in the 1975 collection Tales of Known Space), the first of the Man–Kzin Wars series, features a Bussard ramjet colony ship with a rotating habitable section named the Angel's Pencil.

2000: In the film Mission to Mars, the Mars II, a NASA spacecraft hastily repurposed for a recovery mission of humanity's first mission to Mars in 2020, features a rotating crew habitat whose artificial gravitational rotation is shut down using the ship's attitude control thrusters to allow emergency repairs to the hull following a micrometeoroid shower.

2009: The Jaco Van Dormael film Mr. Nobody shows an alternate timeline in which the main character travels to Mars on a large space vessel that carries the passengers in hypersleep chambers lined up within two large spinning ring structures which provide artificial gravity.

2014: A vessel very similar in design to the NASA-designed Nautilus-X is used in Interstellar. The ship, known as the Endurance, is used as a staging station also capable of interplanetary flight.

2015: The NASA-designed Hermes in the film The Martian is capable of space travel to Mars.

2018: The planetarium film Mars 1001 shows a fictional mission to Mars employing a rotating spacecraft.

=== Related concepts ===
1970: Larry Niven's novel Ringworld and its sequels describe an open-roofed ring-shaped structure centered on a star, with a radius of approximately 1 AU and a habitable inner surface with an area approximately 3 million times that of Earth.

1973: Arthur C. Clarke's novel Rendezvous with Rama involves a 50-by-20-kilometre (31 by 12 mi) cylindrical alien starship (similar to a mobile O'Neill cylinder) that enters our Solar System.

1984: The Peter Hyams-directed film 2010: The Year We Make Contact, based on Arthur C. Clarke's 1982 novella 2010: Odyssey Two, features a battleship-sized, Soviet-built spacecraft (designed by futurist artist Syd Mead), the Leonov, which has a continuously rotating central section, providing an artificial gravity for the occupants, which is however not wheel-shaped.

1994: The humans in the science fiction series Babylon 5 live in an O'Neill cylinder station using rotating sections to provide artificial gravity. Earth Alliance space stations such as the Babylon series (hence the name of the series), transfer stations such as the one at Io near the main Sol system jump gate, and EarthForce Omega-Class destroyer spaceships made extensive use of rotating sections to lengthen deployment times and increase mission flexibility as the effects of zero gravity are no longer a concern.

1999: In the Zenon trilogy (Zenon: Girl of the 21st Century, Zenon: The Zequel and Zenon: Z3), 13-year-old Zenon lives on a rotating space station owned by the fictional WyndComm from 2049 though 2054, but it is not designed in a way that would allow for artificial gravity through centripetal force.

2001: In the video game series Halo created by Bungie, the title refers to a planet-sized open ring (like a Bishop ring) that can harbor Earth-like fauna and environments by simulating gravity through its spinning.

2013: The Neill Blomkamp film Elysium has an enormous space station called Elysium (an open-roofed station 60 kilometres (37 mi) in diameter, somewhere between a much-larger open-roofed Bishop ring and a smaller, fully enclosed Stanford torus). The station in the film supports a city and habitat for the privileged upper classes of Earth.

== See also ==
- Space habitat
- Space colonization
- Weightlessness
- Stanford torus, a design for a 1.8 kilometres (1.1 mi) diameter space habitat capable of housing 10,000 permanent residents, proposed in 1975 by NASA.
- Bishop Ring (habitat)
- O'Neill cylinder, a 5 miles (8.0 km) diameter space settlement design proposed in 1976 by Gerard K. O'Neill.
- Ringworld
- Man Will Conquer Space Soon!, a famous series of 1950s magazine articles detailing Wernher von Braun's plans for crewed spaceflight.
- Mars Direct, proposal for a human mission to Mars. It contains a design to generate artificial gravity by tethering a "Habitat Unit" to a rocket stage and rotating them about a common axis.
- Space stations and habitats in popular culture
