= Multi-Mission Space Exploration Vehicle =

Multi-Mission Space Exploration Vehicle (MMSEV) may refer to:

- Space Exploration Vehicle, a modular spacecraft/rover being developed by NASA
- Nautilus-X, a proposed spacecraft for long-term missions to the Moon or Mars
