= Bishop ring (habitat) =

Hypothetical rotating space habitat

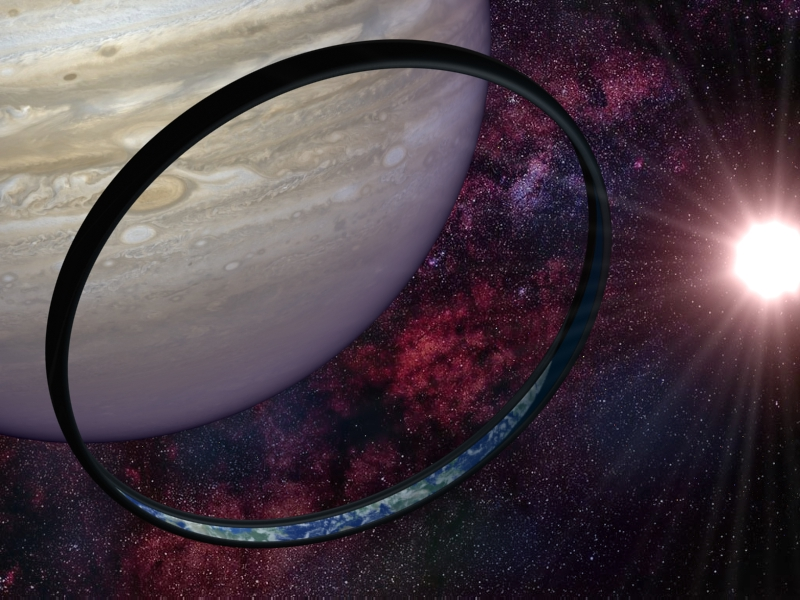
Artist's impression of an orbital from the "Culture" setting of Iain M. Banks

A Bishop ring is a type of hypothetical rotating wheel space station originally proposed in 1997 by Forrest Bishop of the Institute of Atomic-Scale Engineering.

== History ==
The concept is a smaller scale version of the Banks orbital, which itself is a smaller version of the Niven ring. Like other space habitat designs, the Bishop ring would spin to produce artificial gravity by way of centrifugal force. The design differs from the classical designs produced in the 1970s by Gerard K. O'Neill and NASA in that it would use carbon nanotubes instead of steel, allowing the habitat to be built much larger. In the original proposal, the habitat would be approximately 1,000 km (620 mi) in radius and 500 km (310 mi) in width, containing 3 million square kilometres (1.2 million square miles) of living space, comparable to the area of Argentina or India.

Because of its enormous scale, the Bishop Ring would not need to be enclosed like the Stanford torus: it could be built without a "roof", with the atmosphere retained by artificial gravity and atmosphere retention walls some 200 km (120 mi) in height. The habitat would be oriented with its axis of rotation perpendicular to the plane of its orbit, with either an arrangement of mirrors to reflect sunlight onto the inner rim or an artificial light source in the middle, powered by a combination of solar panels on the outer rim and solar power satellites.

Also unlike the 1970s NASA proposals, where habitats would be placed in cislunar space or the Earth–Moon L_{4}/L_{5} Lagrangian points, Forrest Bishop considered other possible positions, including the much more distant Sun–Earth L_{4}/L_{5} Lagrangian points, positions closer to the Sun, and positions in the asteroid belt or beyond.

== Bishop rings in fiction ==
- Bishop Rings are a common type of habitat in the fictional universe of the Orion's Arm worldbuilding project; their radius varies from as little as 100 km to as much as 1000 km (62–620 mi).
- The eponymous Halo ring installations of the Halo video game series are essentially Bishop Rings with slightly divergent proportions.
- Orbitals in Iain M. Banks' The Culture novels are a similar concept but much bigger and thus would require much stronger materials.
- The Echoes of the Eye expansion of the video game Outer Wilds is primarily set on this type of habitat.
- The torus of the film Elysium is open-"topped", allowing space-capable vessels to freely travel into the atmosphere and living space within.

== See also ==
- Halo Array – Video game series
- Island Three – Space settlement concept, another name for O'Neill cylinders
- McKendree cylinder – Space settlement concept
- O'Neill Cylinder – Space settlement concept
- Orbital (The Culture)
- Ringworld, 1970 Larry Niven science fiction novel
- Rotating wheel space station
