= Ringworld =

1970 science fiction novel by Larry Niven

- Paperback first edition
- Author: Larry Niven
- Illustrator: Dean Ellis
- Language: English
- Series: Ringworld storyline from Known Space
- Genre: Science fiction
- Publisher: Ballantine Books
- Publication date: October 1970
- Publication place: United States
- Media type: Print (hardcover, paperback), audiobook
- Pages: 342 pages
- Awards: Locus Award for Best Novel (1971)
- ISBN: 0-345-02046-4
- Followed by: The Ringworld Engineers, 1979

Ringworld is a 1970 science fiction novel by Larry Niven, set in his Known Space universe and considered a classic of science fiction literature. Ringworld tells the story of Louis Wu and his companions on a mission to the Ringworld, an enormous rotating ring, an alien construct in space 186 million miles (299 million kilometres) in diameter. Niven later wrote three sequel novels and then cowrote, with Edward M. Lerner, four prequels and a final sequel; the five latter novels constitute the Fleet of Worlds series. All the novels in the Ringworld series tie into numerous other books set in Known Space. Ringworld won the Nebula Award in 1970, as well as both the Hugo Award and Locus Award in 1971.

== Plot summary ==
On Earth in 2850 AD, a bored Louis Wu is celebrating his 200th birthday. Despite his age, Louis is in perfect physical condition due to the longevity drug boosterspice. Nessus, a Pierson's puppeteer, offers him a mysterious job. Intrigued, Louis accepts. Nessus also recruits the Kzin Speaker-to-Animals and Teela Brown, a young human woman who becomes Louis's lover, for the rest of the ship's crew.

On the puppeteer home world (which is fleeing deadly radiation that will arrive in 20,000 years), they are told that their goal is to determine if the Ringworld, a gigantic artificial ring near the puppeteers' path, poses any threat to their migration. The Ringworld is about one million miles (1.6 million km) wide and approximately the diameter of Earth's orbit, encircling a sunlike star. It rotates to provide artificial gravity 99% as strong as Earth's from centrifugal force. It has a habitable inner surface (equivalent in area to approximately three million Earths), a breathable atmosphere, and a temperature optimal for humans. Night is provided by an inner ring of shadow squares which are connected to each other by thin, ultra-strong wire. When the crew completes its mission, members will be given the starship they used to travel to the puppeteer world; it is about 1000 times faster than any human or Kzinti ship.

When they reach the vicinity of the Ringworld, they are unable to contact anyone. Their ship, the Lying Bastard, is disabled by an automated meteoroid-defense system. The vessel collides with a strand of shadow-square wire and crash-lands near a huge mountain, which is called "Fist-of-God" by the first natives they speak with. The fusion drive is destroyed, so they set out to find a way to get the Lying Bastard off the Ringworld and use the undamaged hyperdrive to return home.

Using their flycycles, they set out for the rim of the ring, searching for technology to help them get home. They encounter primitive human natives who live in the ruins of a once-advanced city. The natives think that Louis is one of the engineers who created the ring, whom they revere as gods. The crew is attacked when Louis accidentally commits what the natives consider a blasphemy, but extricate themselves.

During their journey, Nessus reveals several puppeteer secrets. They initiated research into rendering the Kzinti extinct, considering them dangerous and useless, but found that the numerous Man-Kzin wars—which the Kzinti always lost—had greatly reduced their aggression: a very high percentage of Kzinti males were killed in each conflict, leaving more prudent and cautious survivors to breed. The puppeteers had also used Birthright Lotteries to try to breed humans for luck: all of Teela's ancestors for six generations are lottery winners. Speaker's outrage at learning the former forces Nessus to flee from the group and then follow from a safe distance.

While flying through a giant storm, Teela becomes separated from the others. When Louis and Speaker search for her, their flycycles are caught by an automated trap designed to catch speeders. They are brought to a floating police station. There, they meet Halrloprillalar Hotrufan ("Prill"), a former crew member of a ship that had brought back goods from worlds abandoned by the Ringworld builders. Nessus, using a tasp (a remote pleasure-giving device), conditions Prill into helping and joining them. When her ship returned to the Ringworld the last time, they discovered that civilization had collapsed. Louis surmises that a mold inadvertently brought back by a ship like Prill's mutated and broke down the superconductors vital to the Ringworld civilization, causing its fall.

Teela rejoins them, accompanied by her new lover, a traveling warrior named Seeker who protected her. Based on an insight gained from studying a Ringworld map, Louis comes up with a plan to get home. Teela chooses to remain on the Ringworld with Seeker. Louis, formerly skeptical about breeding for luck, now wonders if the entire mission was caused by Teela's luck, to unite her with her true love and help her mature.

The party collects one end of the shadow-square wire that snapped after the collision with their ship and fell near their path, and drag it behind them. Louis threads it through the Lying Bastard to tether it to the floating police station. "Fist-of-God", the enormous mountain near their crash site, was not on the Ringworld map, leading Louis to guess that it is the result of a meteoroid striking the underside of the ring, pushing the ring's floor up and finally breaking through. The top of the mountain, above the atmosphere, is therefore just a hole. Louis uses the police station to drag the Lying Bastard up and into the hole. Once the ship falls through and clears the ring, they can use its hyperdrive to get home. The book concludes with Louis and Speaker discussing returning to the Ringworld.

== Reception ==
Ringworld was met with immediate critical acclaim and received the "triple crown" of science fiction awards. It won the Nebula Award for Best Novel in 1970, the Hugo Award for Best Novel in 1971, and the Locus Award for Best Novel in 1971.

Reviewers lauded the novel's grand scale and inventiveness. Algis Budrys found Ringworld to be "excellent and entertaining ... woven together very skillfully and proceed[ing] at a pretty smooth pace., Charles N. Brown called it "a first rate adventure story" and remarked that the central megastructure was "so gigantic that it is hard to visualize." The book is frequently identified as a definitive example of the "Big Dumb Object" concept in science fiction.

Ringworld is recognized for its enduring influence. Writing for The Guardian in 2010, Sam Jordison described it as "arguably one of the most influential science fiction novels of the past 50 years. The concept of a habitable, ring-shaped megastructure has been cited as an inspiration for other works, most notably the Halo video game series, which features similar structures known as Halo Rings.

== Concepts reused ==
In addition to the two aliens, a number of concepts in the novel either originate in or were later reused in his other stories:

- The puppeteers' General Products hulls, which are impervious to any known force except visible light and gravity, and for a long time thought indestructible by anything except antimatter. ("Neutron Star") The Fleet of Worlds prequels reveal two other ways that the hulls can be destroyed. The Long Shot was named by Beowulf Shaeffer and previously featured in the story "At the Core".
- The Slaver stasis field, which causes time in the enclosed volume to stand still; since time has for all intents and purposes ceased for an object in stasis, no harm can come to anything within the field. (World of Ptavvs)
- The Slaver sunflower, an invasive genetically engineered plant that destroys all other nearby life with a concentrated beam of light produced from reflected sunlight. On the Ringworld, they form patches bigger than surface area of Earth. (World of Ptavvs)
- The idea that luck is a genetic trait that can be strengthened by selective breeding. (The idea reaches its zenith in "Safe At Any Speed".)
- The tasp, a device that remotely stimulates the pleasure center of the brain; it temporarily incapacitates its target and is extremely psychologically addictive. If the subject cannot, for whatever reason, get access to the device, intense depression can result, often to the point of madness or suicide. To use a tasp on someone from hiding, relieving them of their anger or depression, is called "making their day". (Reused in Death by Ecstasy.)
- Boosterspice, a drug that restores or indefinitely preserves youth. (Mentioned in The Borderland of Sol.)
- Impact armor, a flexible form of clothing that hardens instantly into a rigid form stronger than steel when rapidly deformed, similar to certain types of bulletproof vests.
- The hyperspace shunt, an engine for faster-than-light travel, but slow enough (1 light-year per 3 days, c. 122 c) to keep the galaxy vast and unknown; the new "quantum II hyperspace shunt", developed by the Puppeteers but not yet released to humans, can cross a light-year in just 1.25 minutes (c. 421 000 c). ("Neutron Star". The Long Shot and its Quantum II hyperdrive first appear in "At the Core".)
- Point-to-point teleportation at the speed of light is possible with transfer booths (on Earth) and stepping disks (on the Puppeteer homeworld); on Earth, people's sense of place and global position has been lost due to instantaneous travel; cities and cultures have blended together. (Notably features in "Flash Crowd", which is not set in Known Space.)
- A theme well covered in the novel is that of cultures suffering technological breakdowns who then proceed to revert to belief systems along religious lines. Most Ringworld societies have forgotten that they live on an artificial structure, and now attribute the phenomena and origin of their world to divine power.

== Errors ==
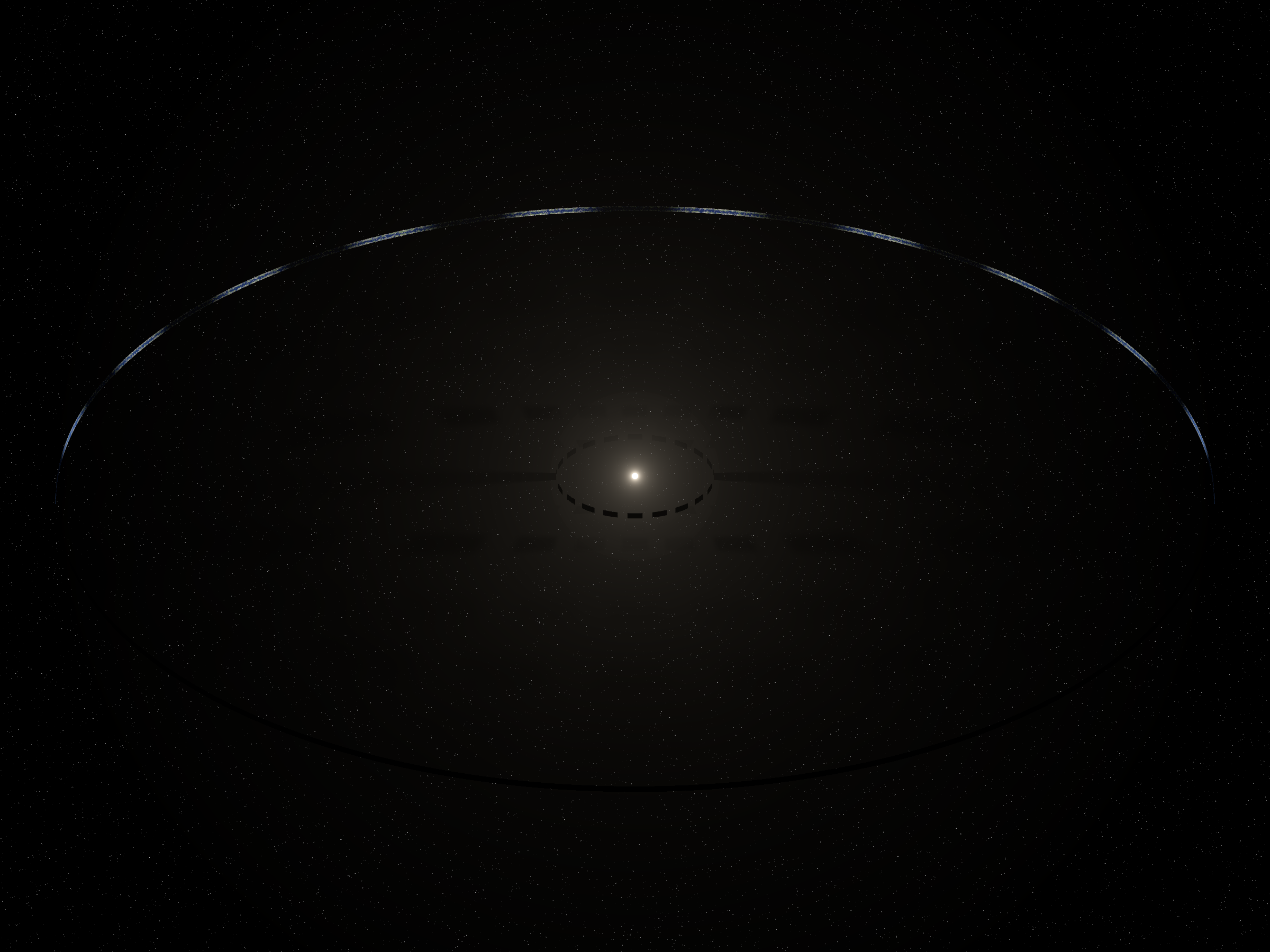
Artist's rendition

The opening chapter of the original paperback edition of Ringworld featured Louis Wu teleporting eastward around the Earth in order to extend his birthday. Moving in this direction would, in fact, make local time later rather than earlier, so that Wu would soon arrive in the early morning of the next calendar day. Niven was "endlessly teased" about this error, which he corrected in subsequent printings to show Wu teleporting westward. In his dedication to The Ringworld Engineers, Niven wrote, "If you own a first paperback edition of Ringworld, it's the one with the mistakes in it. It's worth money."

After the publication of Ringworld, many fans identified numerous engineering problems in the Ringworld as described in the novel. One major one was that the Ringworld, being a rigid structure, was not actually in orbit around the star it encircled and would eventually drift, ultimately colliding with its sun and disintegrating. This led MIT students attending the 1971 Worldcon to chant, "The Ringworld is unstable!" Niven wrote the 1980 sequel The Ringworld Engineers in part to address these engineering issues.

The second chapter refers to standard Earth gravity as 9.98 m/s^{2} (or even gives the unit as m/s [sic]), while standard Earth gravity is 9.81 m/s^{2}. The fifth chapter refers to Nereid as Neptune's largest moon; the planet's largest moon is Triton.

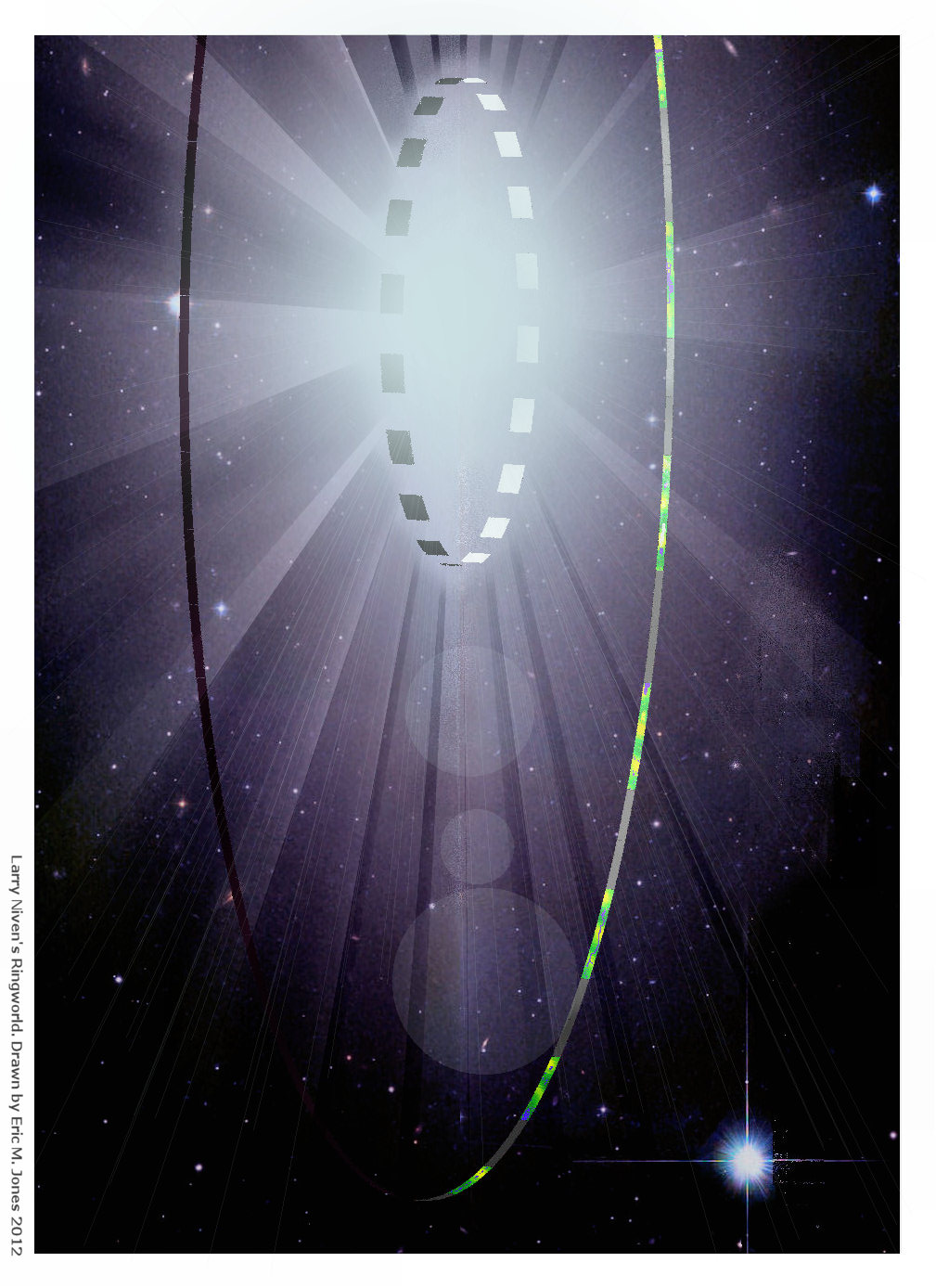
Ringworld

== Influence ==
"Ringworld" has become a generic term for such a structure, which is an example of what science fiction fans call a "Big Dumb Object", or more formally a megastructure. Other science fiction authors have devised their own variants of Niven's Ringworld, notably Iain M. Banks' Culture Orbitals, best described as miniature Ringworlds, and the titular ring-shaped Halo structures of the video game series Halo. Such a mini-Ringworld appears in Star Wars: The Book of Boba Fett, season 1, episode 5. In the Paramount+ series Star Trek: Lower Decks season 4, episode 3, "In the Cradle of Vexilon", a Ringworld-like world is prominently featured.

== Adaptations ==
=== Games ===
In 1984, a role-playing game based on this setting was produced by Chaosium named The Ringworld Roleplaying Game. Information from the RPG, along with notes composed by RPG author John Hewitt with Niven, was later used to form the "Bible" given to authors writing in the Man-Kzin Wars series. Niven himself recommended that Hewitt write one of the stories for the original two MKW books, although this never came to pass.

Tsunami Games released two adventure games based on Ringworld. Ringworld: Revenge of the Patriarch was released in 1992 and Return to Ringworld in 1994. A third game, Ringworld: Within ARM's Reach, was also planned, but never completed.

The video game franchise Halo, created by Bungie, took inspiration from the book in the creation and development of its story around the eponymous rings, called Halos. These are physically similar to the Ringworld, however they are much smaller and do not encircle the star, instead orbiting stars or planets.

The open source video game Endless Sky features an alien species that creates ringworlds.

In 2017, Paradox Interactive added a DLC called "Utopia" to their game Stellaris, allowing the player to restore or build ringworlds.

=== On screen ===
There have been many aborted attempts to adapt the novel to the screen.

In 2001, Larry Niven reported that a movie deal had been signed and was in the early planning stages.

In 2004, the Sci-Fi Channel reported that it was developing a Ringworld miniseries. The series never came to fruition.

In 2013, it was again announced by the channel, now rebranded as Syfy, that a miniseries of the novel was in development. This proposed four-hour miniseries was being written by Michael R. Perry and would have been a co-production between MGM Television and Universal Cable Productions.

In 2017, Amazon announced that Ringworld was one of three science fiction series it was developing for its streaming service. MGM were again listed as a co-producer.

=== OEL manga ===
Tor/Seven Seas (same joint venture of Macmillan's Tor Books and Seven Seas Entertainment who also published the English-language translation of Afro Samurai) published a two-part original English-language manga adaptation of Ringworld, with the script written by Robert Mandell and the artwork by Sean Lam. Ringworld: The Graphic Novel, Part One, covering the events of the novel up to the sunflower attack on Speaker, was released on July 8, 2014. Part Two was released on November 10, 2015.

== In other works ==
- Terry Pratchett intended his 1981 novel Strata to be a "piss-take/homage/satire" of Ringworld. Niven took it in good humor and enjoyed the work.
- The plot of the first-person shooter game series Halo involves artificial ring structures known as the Halo Array. Similarities to Ringworld have been noted, and Niven was asked (but declined) to write the first novel based on the series.
- "All in Fun" by Jerry Oltion, in Fantasy & Science Fiction, January 2009, mentions a faithful big-budget movie adaptation of Ringworld.
- In Ernest Cline's 2011 novel Ready Player One, one of the sectors of the OASIS, the worldwide virtual reality network that is the novel's primary setting, is mentioned as being an adaptation of Ringworld.
- The 1987 novel The Alexandrian Ring by William R. Forstchen takes place on a ring much like Niven's.
- Episode 5 of The Book of Boba Fett features a station called Glavis that is shaped like a ring and features sun shades in much the same way that Niven's does.
- The Orion's Arm worldbuilding setting has ringworlds as one type of megastructure, with direct reference to Niven as the one who came up with the idea. Most use super-strong magmatter in their construction (similar to the scrith in Niven's Ringworld), though the first ringworlds in Orion's Am instead use the same technology used in orbital rings.
- Niven himself, along with co-author Gregory Benford, later wrote about a similar concept in the Bowl of Heaven novel series. The eponymous Bowl, rather than being a ring, is shaped like a bowl with a hole in the bottom. It essentially combines the Ringworld design with that of a stellar engine: reflective surfaces on the Bowl reflect some of the central star's light back onto a small portion of the star, causing it to produce a jet that passes through the bottom hole of the Bowl. The star is pushed by this jet, and the Bowl (linked to it by gravity) is brought along as well.

== Books in series ==
- Ringworld (1970)
- The Ringworld Engineers (1979)
- The Ringworld Throne (1996)
- Ringworld's Children (2004)
- Fleet of Worlds (2007)
- Juggler of Worlds (2008)
- Destroyer of Worlds (2009)
- Betrayer of Worlds (2010)
- Fate of Worlds: Return from the Ringworld (2012)

== See also ==
- Bishop Ring (habitat)
- Dyson sphere
- Megastructure
- Orbital (The Culture)
- Orbital ring
- Stanford torus
