= Ixion (video game) =

2022 video game

- Developer: Bulwark Studios
- Publisher: Kasedo Games
- Director: Emmanuel Monnereau
- Designers: Emmanuel Monnereau; Jeremy Guery
- Artist: Lucas Terryn
- Writer: Julien Audebert
- Composer: Guillaume David
- Engine: Unity
- Platforms: Microsoft Windows, PlayStation 5, Xbox Series X/S
- Release: Microsoft Windows; December 7, 2022; PlayStation 5, Xbox Series X/S; April 8, 2025
- Genres: City-building, survival
- Mode: Single-player

Ixion is a city building survival simulation video game developed by Bulwark Studios and published by Kasedo Games where players take control of a mobile space station traveling across space in search for a suitable planet for colonization after Earth was destroyed. It was released for Windows on December 7, 2022. Ports for PlayStation 5 and Xbox Series X/S were released on April 8, 2025.

== Gameplay ==
The player takes the role of "the Administrator" in charge of the VVS (VOHLE Void Structure) Tiqqun (pronounced: "tycoon"), a mobile rotating wheel space station equipped with the "VOHLE engine" that allows interstellar travel. The Tiqqun's interior is divided into six sectors, within which the player can construct the required structures inside the interior for housing and resource processing and storage, as well as a system to transfer resources and population from one sector to another. The Tiqqun can construct docking bays that hold up to three ships apiece, with three types of ships to choose from: mining ships (to harvest raw materials from asteroids), cargo ships (to carry the mined materials or other resources found during the Tiqqun's journey), and science ships (required to interact with "events" in the different systems the Tiqqun visits). The player must juggle three major necessities to preserve the Tiqqun on its voyage: Its hull integrity, which is maintained by using EVA airlocks to apply repairs to the hull; the stability of the workforce in each sector, assisted by certain structures or gameplay decisions; and the trust of the overall population of the Tiqqun. The player is assisted in certain tasks by "Edden", the personal assistant AI aboard the Tiqqun, who alerts the player to events both onboard and outside the station (such as accidents or worker strikes, as well as cosmic weather conditions that might affect the Tiqqun's hull integrity).

The game ends when either the player completes the campaign, the Tiqqun's hull integrity fails, or the crew's trust drops so low that they mutiny and topple the player's administration.

== Plot ==
In the year 2049, the mobile station Tiqqun created by the DOLOS Aerospace Engineering Corporation performs a test run of their VOHLE engine, developed for interstellar travel. However, the VOHLE engine's activation shatters the Moon, resulting in the "Lunaclysm" that devastates Earth. In the ensuing chaos, the United Nations declares DOLOS an "enemy of humanity" and starts pursuing members of the company and all groups allied with it. The Tiqqun returns an unknown amount of time later, finding Earth completely uninhabitable. Gathering what resources they could find (including survivors stored in cryonic stasis), the Tiqqun discovers that DOLOS dispatched another ship, the Protagoras, to a habitable exoplanet codenamed "Remus", which would be a new home for the survivors of Earth. The crew also discovers "IXION", a more stable VOHLE engine, at a DOLOS facility on Jupiter, and installs it aboard the Tiqqun.

After leaving the Solar System for good, the Tiqqun's onboard artificial intelligence, Edden, warns that continued use of the VOHLE engine causes irreparable damage to the Tiqqun, which will eventually destroy it. The Tiqqun crew discovers from the Protagoras' AI, Valhalla, that the ship was attacked by the UN vessel Etemenanki, which has taken the coordinates to Remus. The Tiqqun follows the Etemenanki's VOHLE signature, only to find that the UN vessel has been completely destroyed and the coordinates taken by the Piranesi, a vessel belonging to a shadow group called the "Black Market Society". Following the Piranesi's VOHLE signature, the Tiqqun finds the ship powered down near a dormant pulsar, and sends a science team to recover the coordinates to Remus. However, the Piranesi reactivates and attacks the Tiqqun. The ship's AI, Naraka, has achieved sentience and seeks to destroy the Tiqqun and consume it. By turning the Tiqqun's hull into a makeshift Faraday cage while inducing a pulse from the pulsar, the crew manages to disable the Piranesi and recover the coordinates to Remus.

Upon arriving, the Tiqqun is contacted by the Ashtangites, evolved humans and old partners of DOLOS who performed bioengineering on their bodies to live in harmony with the ecosystem of Remus and offers them the opportunity to settle on Remus, as long as they pass through the same process. Alternatively, the Administrator of the Tiqqun learns that Edden is purposely hiding the presence of another habitable planet in the same system, codenamed "Romulus" and also has the option of disabling Edden and settling there instead without genetic modification. However, the Piranesi recovers from the pulsar attack and follows after the Tiqqun. After evacuating the crew to either Remus or Romulus, the Tiqqun (piloted either by Edden, the Administrator, or a recovered Valhalla, depending on player choices) rams into the Piranesi at full power, destroying both. As the Tiqqun crew settles on their new world, a recording from DOLOS founder Vanir Dolos in the end cutscene reveals that he knew the Lunaclysm would occur, and that the success of the Tiqqun's mission ensured humanity's survival.

== Reception ==
Reception

Aggregate score
Aggregator	Score
Metacritic	71/100

Review score
Publication	Score
PC Gamer (US)	54/100

Ixion received "mixed or average reviews", according to the review aggregator website Metacritic.

PC Gamer called Ixion "[a]n enticing premise held back by uneven pacing and glaring technical issues", noting that it was "balanced and calmly elegiac busywork for the first few hours, even if Bulwark decides to keep the training wheels on a bit too long". However, they criticized the amount of time required to stay in place to complete chapter-closing tasks, "dousing your excitement at, ironically, the exact moment you yearn to go gallivanting somewhere new", as well as the effect of the game's production chain management on the sustainability of the layout of a player's buildings, opining that "the way Ixion stealthily slides into doom-spirals of unsustainability makes reloading preferable to redesigning".

Screen Rant compared Ixion to Frostpunk, lauding its "incredibly detailed mechanics", but noting two flaws with those mechanics: that it was "not too welcoming to players that are new to the genre because the sheer amount of tasks, resources, and responsibilities will quickly become overwhelming", and that despite having a high-end graphics card, the game crashed regularly.

During the 26th Annual D.I.C.E. Awards, the Academy of Interactive Arts & Sciences nominated Ixion for "Strategy/Simulation Game of the Year".
