= Above: Space Development Corporation =

Company proposing to develop space stations

Above: Space Development Corporation (formerly Orbital Assembly Corporation) is an American aerospace company that has announced several widely publicized plans to build various space stations. As of 2024, no funding for the projects has been announced and construction of the stations has not started.

== Space station proposals ==
The Voyager Space Station or Voyager Station (previously the Von Braun Station) is a proposed rotating wheel space station that aims to be the first commercial space hotel.

It is proposed that the SpaceX Starship could be used to shuttle space tourists to the Voyager Station, which would accommodate 280 guests and 112 crew members. The cost of a trip to the station has not been officially published, but some estimates are that it would be approximately US$5 million, and would require the passengers to undergo safety and physical training before boarding the shuttle for a 3 1/2 day trip to the space station. The cost of the space station has been estimated to be in the "tens of billions". Voyager Station would have partial artificial gravity from its rotation to maintain lunar gravity—approximately 1/6 of Earth's gravity.

Above Space has also announced a smaller Pioneer Station that can house only 28 people but could be operational earlier.

== Legal action ==
On September 29, 2026, the Securities and Exchange Commission filed a settled action against the company and its executives, alleging they had provided false or misleading information about the status of the company's projects. The action noted that the company had raised $2.9 million from 1,400 retail investors, when according to its own estimates the construction of a Voyager-class station would cost $4-6 billion. In October, the three parties consented to the final judgment without admitting the allegations, permanently enjoining them from violating Section 17(a)(3) of the Securities Act.

== See also ==
- Gateway Spaceport
- List of space stations
