= Gateway Spaceport =

American organization that proposes to build an artificial gravity space station

Gateway Spaceport was formed in 2012 to build the first rotating spaceport and space hotel. On January 1, 2022, Gateway Foundation's name was changed to Gateway Spaceport LLC.

Their plan to develop the spaceport includes developing a robust space construction industry, the first artificial gravity space station, and ultimately the Gateway, a city in space with a spaceport.

== The Gateway Spaceport ==
The Gateway Spaceport's design is inspired in part by the ideas of Wernher von Braun, who pioneered in the field of human spaceflight. It has been designed to connect people from all over the world so we can make this first step together by being a staging point between spacecraft from Earth and from other space stations, the moon and outer planets.

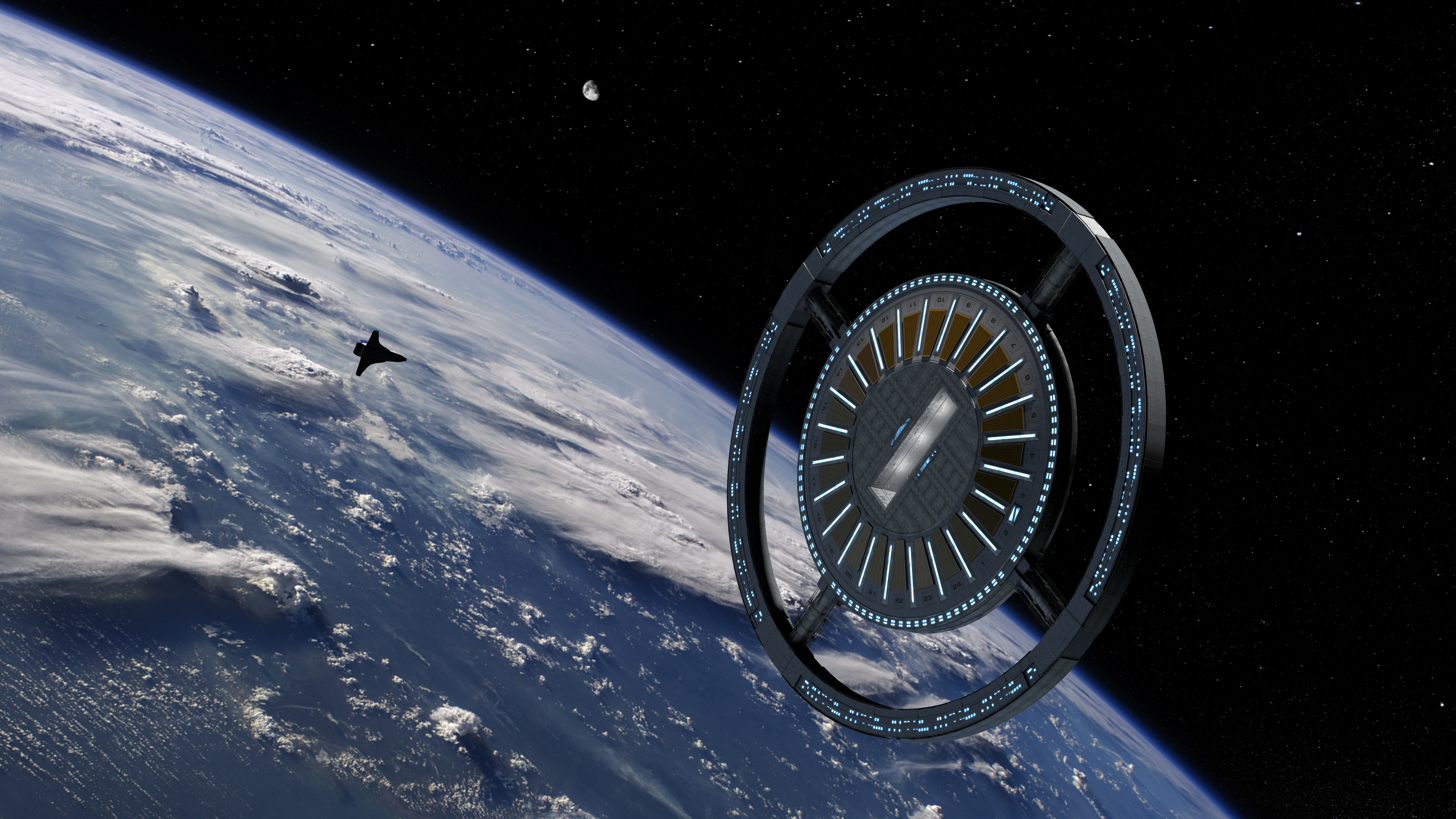
The Gateway Spaceport

== See also ==
- Voyager Station
- Aurora Space Station
- Bigelow Commercial Space Station
