= Nautilus-X =

Rotating wheel space station concept by NASA

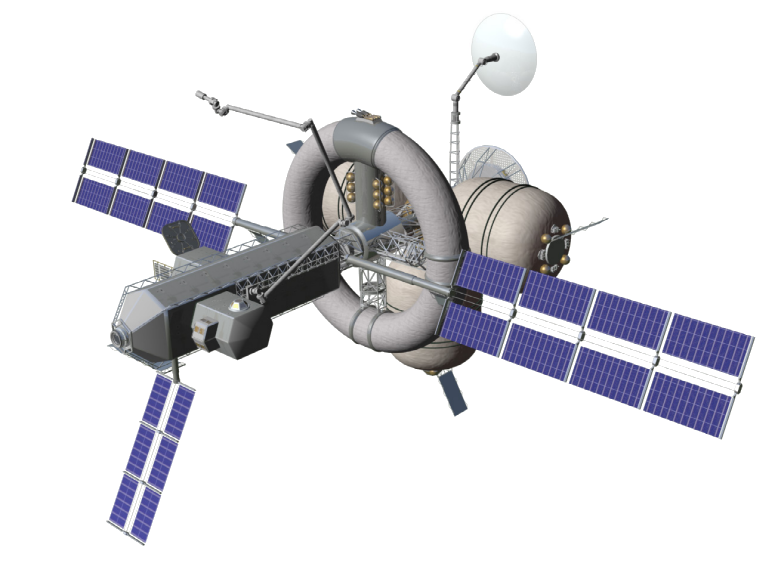
- Nautilus-X spacecraft
- Operator: NASA
- Applications: Multi-mission crewed spacecraft

Production
- Status: Concept

Nautilus-X (Non-Atmospheric Universal Transport Intended for Lengthy United States Exploration) is a rotating wheel space station concept developed by engineers Mark Holderman and Edward Henderson of the Technology Applications Assessment Team of NASA.

The concept was first proposed in January 2011 for long-duration (1 to 24 months) exo-atmospheric space journeys for a six-person crew. In order to limit the effects of microgravity on human health, the spacecraft would be equipped with a centrifuge.

The design was intended to be relatively inexpensive by crewed spaceflight standards, as it was projected to cost US$3.7 billion. In addition, it was suggested that it might only need 64 months of work.

The project was cancelled in favour of other projects due to budget constraints.

== Objectives ==
The original goal of Nautilus-X was to be a stopover to long-term missions for the Moon or Mars. To ease route planning of the whole mission, the station would be placed at the Lagrange point L1 or L2 of the Moon or Mars, depending on which location is to be visited.

It would also have served as an emergency station and hospital for current mission crews.

Other objectives included:

- Self-sustained for long-duration missions with crews as large as 6.
- Support crewed landing missions.
- Satisfy requirements of NASA Authorization Act of 2010.

== Description ==
=== Design ===
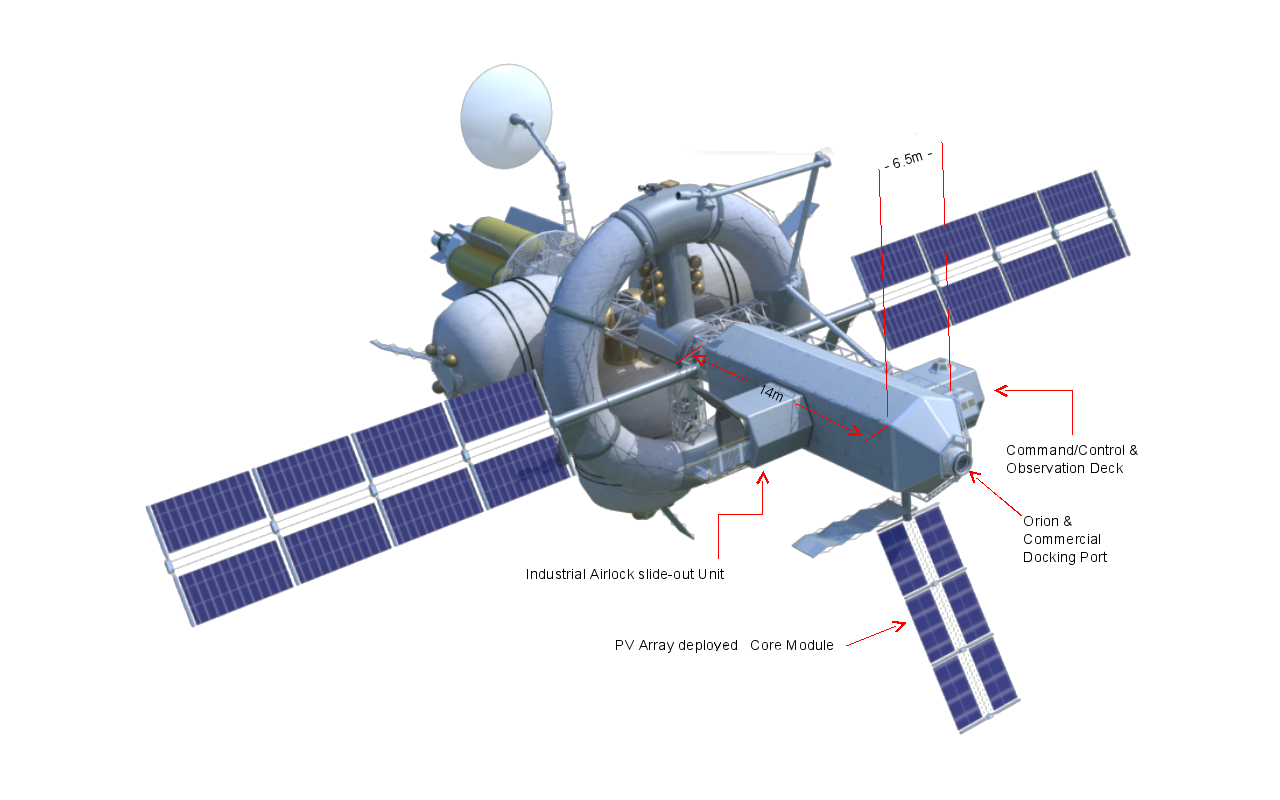
Nautilus-X Main module dimensions

The proposal notionally included a 21-by-46-foot (6.5 by 14 m) main corridor, a rotating habitable centrifuge, inflatable modules for logistical stores and crew use, solar power arrays, and a reconfigurable thrust structure.

The design was modular, enabling it to accommodate any of a number of mission specific propulsion modules, manipulator arms, docking port for an Orion or commercial crew capsule, and landing craft for destination worlds. In theory the engines and fuel could be swapped out depending on the mission. The proposal also had an industrial slide-out airlock unit and a command, control and observation deck.

On the other end of the docking port would have been the spacecraft's centrifuge equipped with an external dynamic ring-flywheel. Behind the centrifuge would be water and slush hydrogen tanks, which could mitigate the dangers of cosmic radiation for the crew, to a degree. The aft of the craft would contain the communication and propulsion systems.

The standard version of Nautilus-X had three inflatable modules. The Extended Duration Explorer variant on the Nautilus-X design concept would have several more, plus docking bays for science payloads and away-mission vehicles.

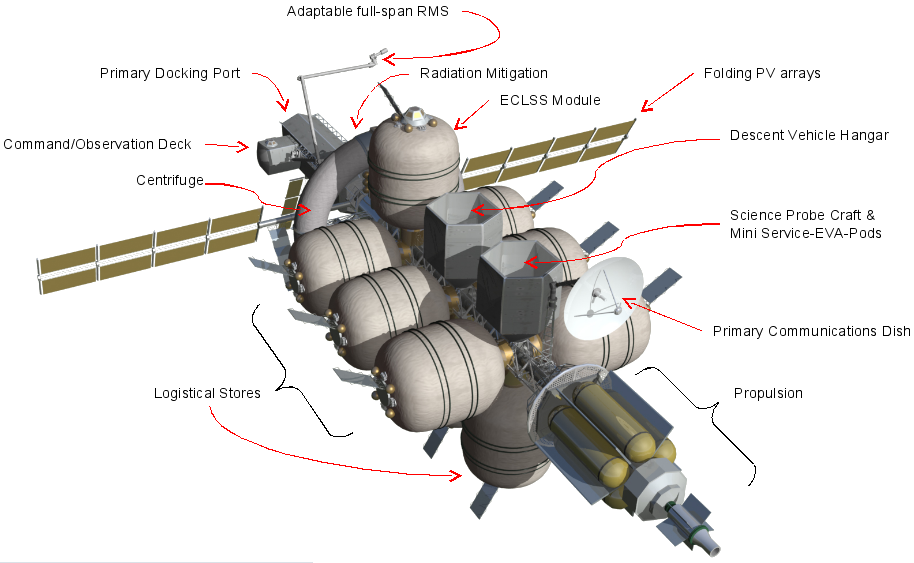
Nautilus-X Extended duration explorer

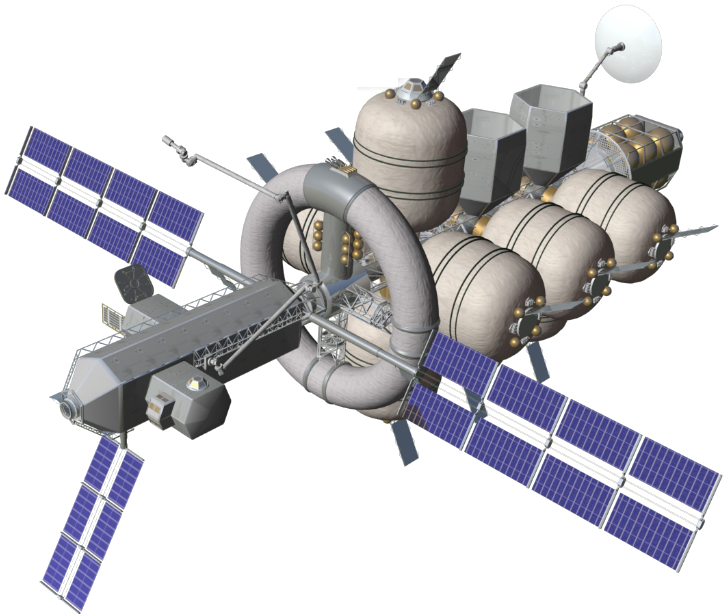
Nautilus-X Extended duration explorer – front view

=== Technologies ===
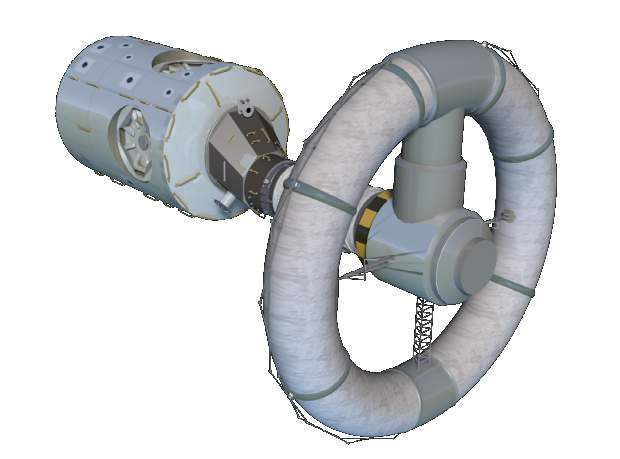
Nautilus-X ISS demonstrator

In order to deploy this massive spacecraft as easily as possible, it would consist of a variety of rigid and inflatable modules and solar dynamic arrays. The expandable modules are based on the technology used by the inflatable living quarters proposed by Bigelow Aerospace, which has continued the development of inflatable modules initially designed and developed by NASA.

=== Attributes ===
- Environmental Control and Life Support and communication suite
- Large storage volumes (for food, mechanical parts or medical supplies)
- Visual command and observe capability for crew
- Low crew irradiation
- Semi-autonomous integration of multiple mission specific propulsion units

== Status as of 2011 ==
The Nautilus-X design concept did not advance beyond the initial drawings and proposal.

=== ISS centrifuge demonstration ===
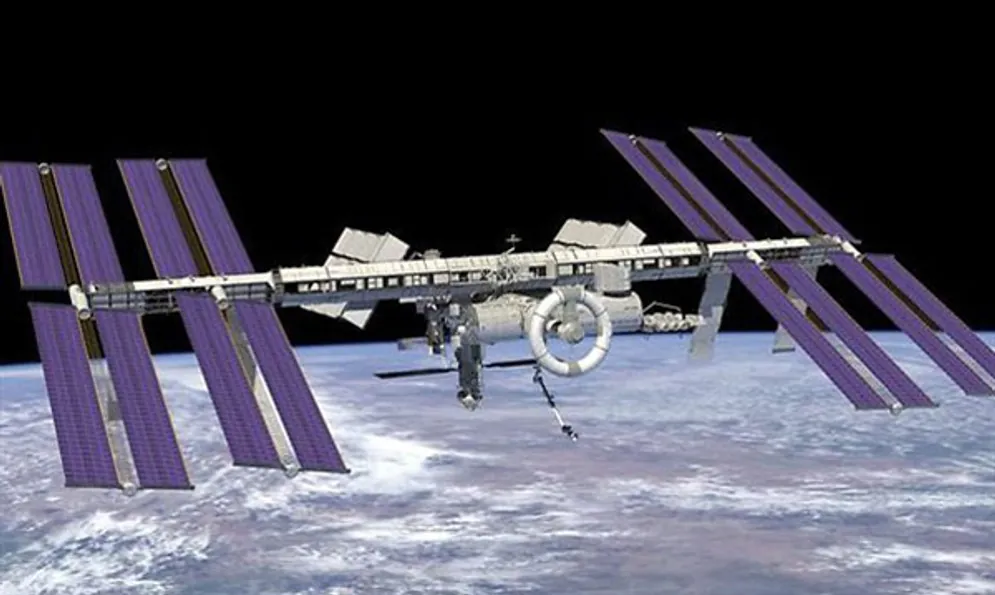
Rendering of a theorised docking to the ISS

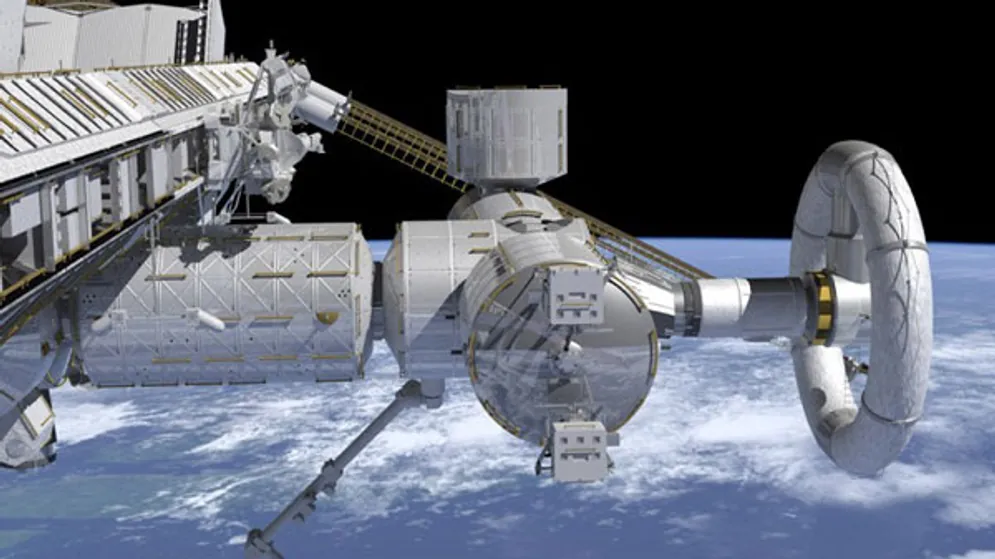
Rendering of a theorised docking to the ISS (side)

In order to assess and characterize influences and effects of the centrifuge relative to human reactions, mechanical dynamic responses and influences, the demonstration of a similar centrifuge first would be tested on the International Space Station (ISS).

If produced, this centrifuge would have been the first in-space demonstration of sufficient scale for artificial partial-g effects. The demonstrator would be sent using a single Delta IV or Atlas V launcher. The full cost of such a demonstrator would be between US$83 million and US$143 million.

== See also ==
- Lunar Gateway
- Rotating wheel space station
