= Stanford torus =

Proposed NASA design for space habitat

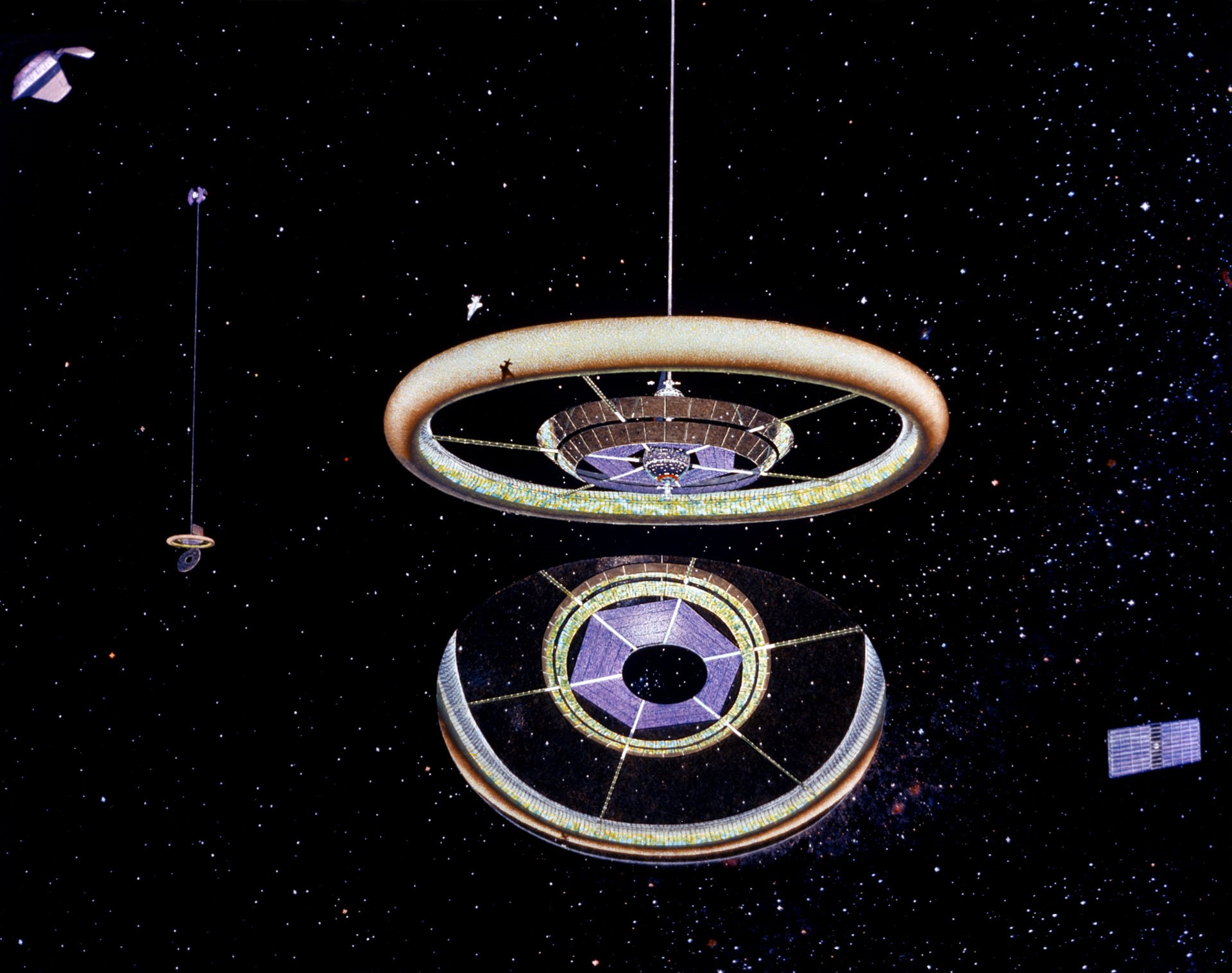
Exterior view of a Stanford torus. Bottom center is the non-rotating primary solar mirror, which reflects sunlight onto the angled ring of secondary mirrors around the hub. Painting by Donald E. Davis.

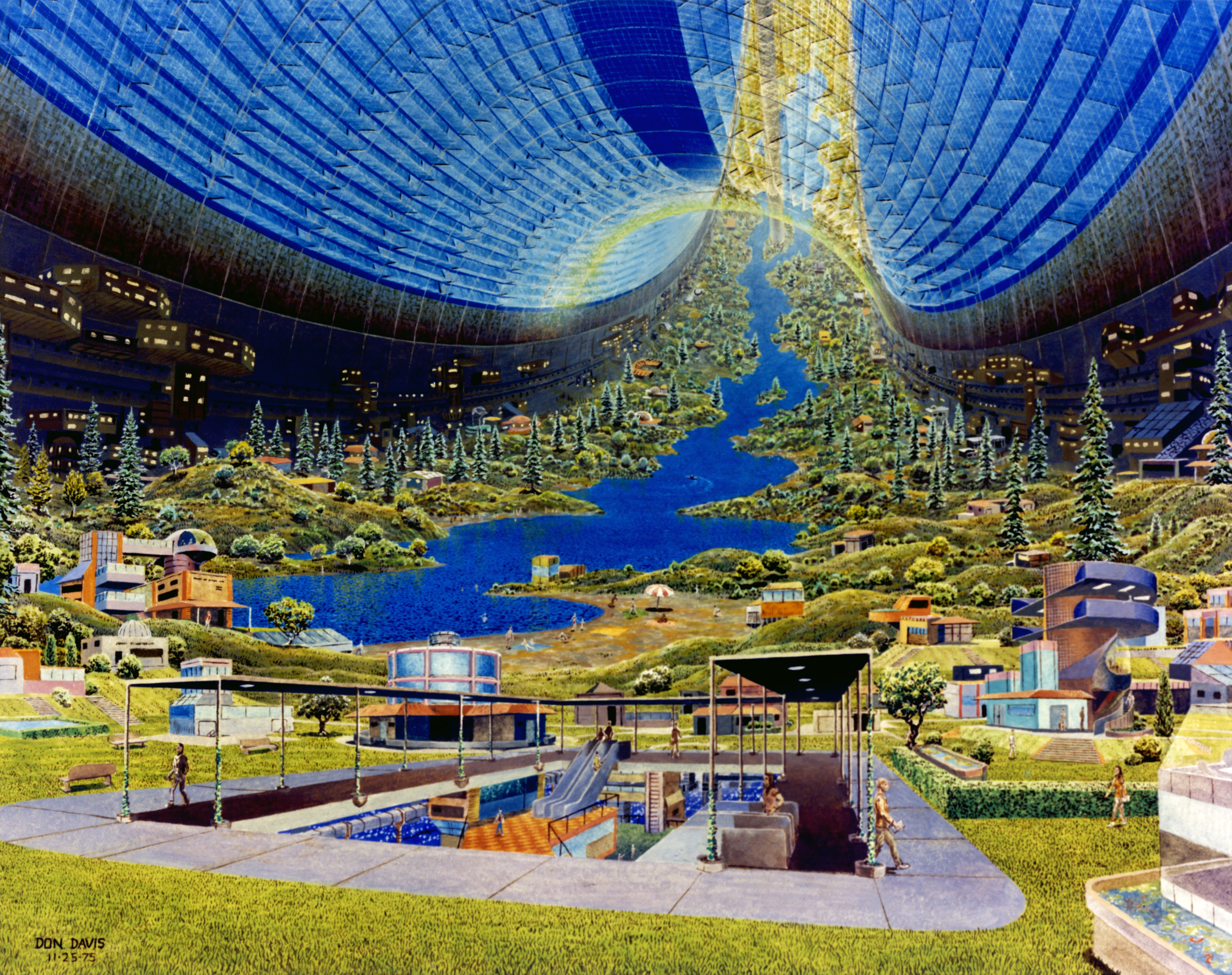
Interior of a Stanford torus, painted by Donald E. Davis

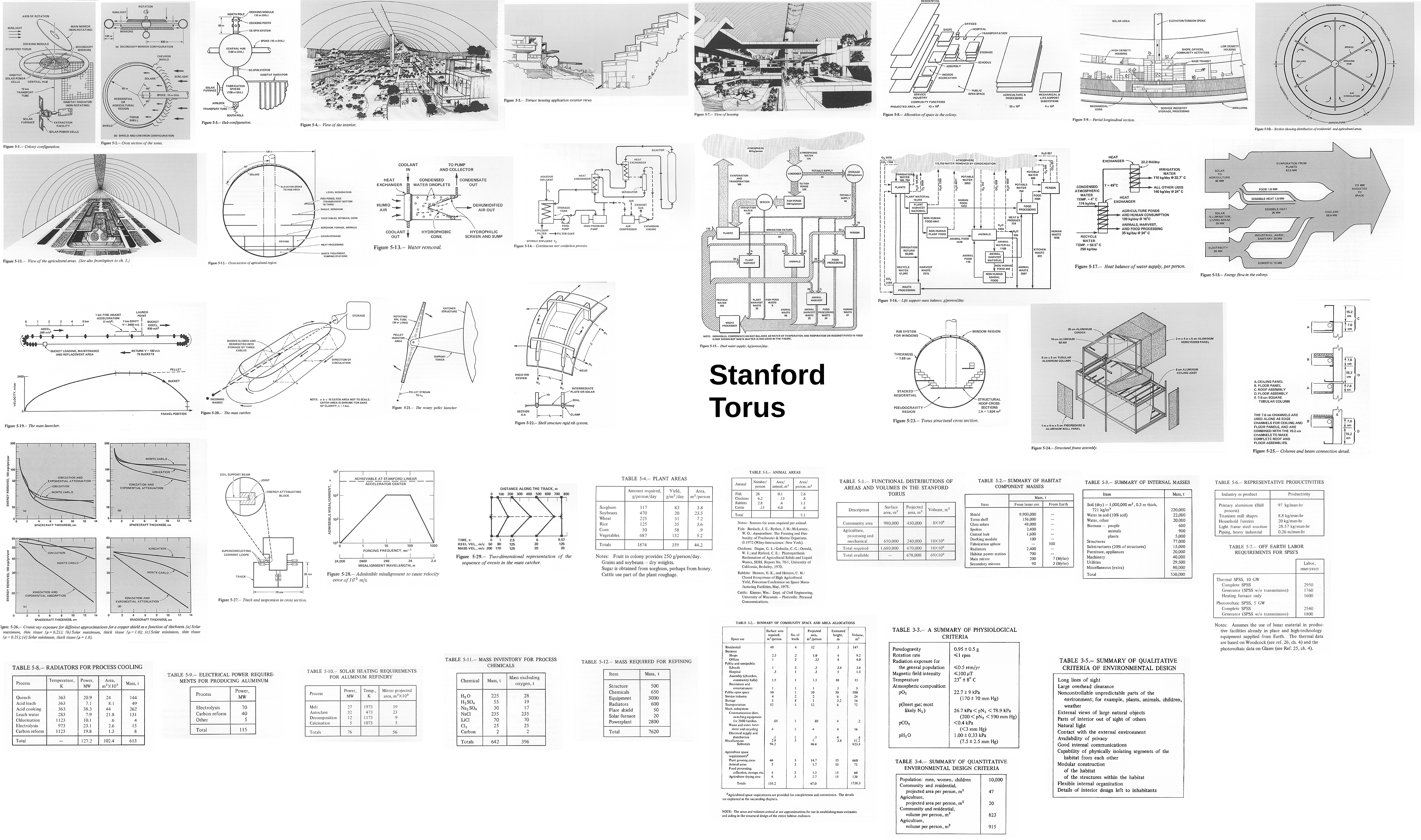
Collage of figures and tables of Stanford Torus space habitat, from Space Settlements: A Design Study book. Charles Holbrow and Richard D. Johnson, NASA, 1977.

The Stanford torus is a proposed NASA design for a space settlement capable of housing 10,000 permanent residents. It is a type of rotating wheel space station, consisting of a ring with a diameter of about 1.8 km (1.1 mi), its rotation providing about 1.0 g of artificial gravity.

== History of the concept ==
The Stanford torus was proposed during the 1975 NASA Summer Study, conducted at Stanford University, with the purpose of exploring and speculating on designs for future space colonies, with the conclusions and the detailed proposal being published in 1977 in Space Settlements: A Design Study book, by Richard D. Johnson and Charles H. Holbrow (Gerard O'Neill later proposed his Island One or Bernal sphere as an alternative to the torus). "Stanford torus" refers only to this particular version of the design, as the concept of a ring-shaped rotating space station was previously proposed by Konstantin Tsiolkovsky ("Bublik-City", 1903), Herman Potočnik (1923) and Wernher von Braun (1952), among others.

== Design ==
The Stanford torus (the proposed 10,000 people habitat described in the 1975 Summer Study, to be distinguished from other rotating wheel space station designs) consists of a torus, or doughnut-shaped ring, that is 1.8 km (1.1 mi) in diameter and rotates once per minute to provide between 0.9 g and 1.0 g of artificial gravity on the inside of the outer ring via centrifugal force.

Sunlight is provided to the interior of the torus by a system of mirrors, including a large non-rotating primary solar mirror.

The ring is connected to a hub via a number of "spokes", which serve as conduits for people and materials travelling to and from the hub. Since the hub is at the rotational axis of the station, it experiences the least artificial gravity and is the easiest location for spacecraft to dock. Zero-gravity industry is performed in a non-rotating module attached to the hub's axis.

The interior space of the torus itself is used as living space, and is large enough that a "natural" environment can be simulated; the torus appears similar to a long, narrow, straight glacial valley whose ends curve upward and eventually meet overhead to form a complete circle. The population density is similar to a dense suburb, with part of the ring dedicated to agriculture and part to housing.

The Stanford Torus design was not conceived for a single, isolated space settlement, but as part of a system for the colonization of space. Part of the people living in the colony would work in the construction of satellite solar power stations and new colonies, so that the habitat would be capable of self-replication, with a full system of multiple Stanford toruses being eventually built.

=== Chosen shape ===
The 1975 NASA Summer Study evaluated several options for the space habitat design, including spherical and cylindrical shapes, in addition to the toroidal one. The torus was chosen as the best option, among other reasons, because it minimized the amount of mass required to have the same area and radius of rotation.

=== General characteristics ===
- Location: Earth–Moon L5 Lagrangian point.
- Human population: 10,000.
- Total mass: 10 million metric tons (9.8 million long tons; 11 million short tons) (including radiation shield (95% of total mass), habitat, and atmosphere).
- Diameter: 1,790 m (1.11 mi).
- Circumference: 5,623.45 m (3.49 mi).
- Rotation: 1 revolution per minute.
- Temperature: 23 ± 8 °C (73 ± 14 °F)
- Radiation shield (non-rotating): 1.7 meters (5.6 feet) thick raw lunar soil.

=== Components ===
- Habitation tube (torus proper) with a diameter of 130 m (430 ft). 2/3 of its surface consists of aluminum plates and the remaining 1/3 is filled with glass windows mounted on aluminum ribs, to allow sunlight to enter inside the torus.
- Non-rotating main mirror that directs sunlight towards the central hub.
- Central hub with a diameter of 130 m (430 ft). Secondary mirrors around the central hub direct sunlight towards the habitation tube.
- Fabrication sphere (non-rotating), connected to central hub's South Pole, with a diameter of 100 m (330 ft). It is also connected to a solar furnace and the habitat radiator.
- Docking module (non-rotating), connected to central hub's North Pole, with a diameter of 15 m (49 ft) and a length of 60 m (200 ft).
- Spokes: 6 spokes of 15 m (49 ft) diameter, connecting the central hub with the habitation tube. They have elevators, power cables, and heat exchange pipes between the torus and the hub.

=== Area and volume allocation ===
The circumference of the torus proper (about 5,600 m (18,400 ft) in all) would be divided into 6 sections of equal length. 3 of the sections would be used for agriculture and the remaining 3 for residential uses. Agricultural and residential sections would alternate. A central plain would run through the full length of the torus. To gain space, structures would be terraced over the curved walls of the torus, while many commercial facilities (such as large shops, light industry or mechanical facilities) would be below the level of the central plain. According to the figures included in the study, the plain's floor would be about 1/4 of tube's diameter over the torus bottom, and each spoke would connect at the center of one of the 6 sections.

==== Non-agricultural uses ====
Use	Used land area	Number of levels	Total usable area (Note: The total usable area does not always exactly match with the product of the used land area multiplied by the number of levels.)	Height per level	Volume	Notes
Residential	120,000 m^{2} (1,300,000 sq ft)	4	490,000 m^{2} (5,300,000 sq ft)	3 m (9.8 ft)	1,470,000 m^{3} (52,000,000 cu ft)	Including dwelling units (37 m^{2} (400 sq ft)/person), private exterior space and pedestrian access space (12 m^{2} (130 sq ft)/person of total exterior space). Modular housing, allowing for one- or two-level clustered homes, as well as grouped apartment buildings with 4 or 5 stories, and terraced homes taking advantage of the edges of the central plain that runs through the torus
Shops	10,000 m^{2} (110,000 sq ft)	2	23,000 m^{2} (250,000 sq ft)	4 m (13 ft)	92,000 m^{3} (3,200,000 cu ft)	The authors of the study determined the space use from recommendations that call for 10 shops per 1000 people
Offices	3,300 m^{2} (36,000 sq ft)	3	10,000 m^{2} (110,000 sq ft)	4 m (13 ft)	40,000 m^{3} (1,400,000 cu ft)	
Schools	3,000 m^{2} (32,000 sq ft)	3	10,000 m^{2} (110,000 sq ft)	3.8 m (12 ft)	38,000 m^{3} (1,300,000 cu ft)	With community multimedia center. The authors of the study calculated the space use for a student population of 10% of total population
Hospital	3,000 m^{2} (32,000 sq ft)	1	3,000 m^{2} (32,000 sq ft)	5 m (16 ft)	15,000 m^{3} (530,000 cu ft)	50-bed hospital with all the different needed facilities
Assembly (churches, community halls, theaters)	15,000 m^{2} (160,000 sq ft)	1	15,000 m^{2} (160,000 sq ft)	10 m (33 ft)	150,000 m^{3} (5,300,000 cu ft)	
Recreation and entertainment	10,000 m^{2} (110,000 sq ft)	1	10,000 m^{2} (110,000 sq ft)	3 m (9.8 ft)	30,000 m^{3} (1,100,000 cu ft)	All commercial entertainment, including indoor activities and restaurants
Public open space	100,000 m^{2} (1,100,000 sq ft)	1	100,000 m^{2} (1,100,000 sq ft)	50 m (160 ft)	5,000,000 m^{3} (180,000,000 cu ft)	Parks, zoo, outdoor recreation (swimming, golf, playgrounds)
Service industry	20,000 m^{2} (220,000 sq ft)	2	40,000 m^{2} (430,000 sq ft)	6 m (20 ft)	240,000 m^{3} (8,500,000 cu ft)	Light service industry of personal goods, furniture, handicrafts, etc.
Storage	10,000 m^{2} (110,000 sq ft)	4	50,000 m^{2} (540,000 sq ft)	3.2 m (10 ft)	160,000 m^{3} (5,700,000 cu ft)	Wholesaling and storage
Transportation	120,000 m^{2} (1,300,000 sq ft)	1	120,000 m^{2} (1,300,000 sq ft)	6 m (20 ft)	720,000 m^{3} (25,000,000 cu ft)	15 m (49 ft) width for typical streets. Ring road around the torus, at the edge of the central plain. Mass transport system consisting of a moving sidewalk, monorail, and minibus
Communication switching equipment (for 2800 families)	500 m^{2} (5,400 sq ft)	1	500 m^{2} (5,400 sq ft)	4 m (13 ft)	2,000 m^{3} (71,000 cu ft)	Communication and telephone distribution
Waste and water treatment and recycling	40,000 m^{2} (430,000 sq ft)	1	40,000 m^{2} (430,000 sq ft)	4 m (13 ft)	160,000 m^{3} (5,700,000 cu ft)	Including water supply, return and recycling, and sewage treatment
Electrical supply and distribution	1,000 m^{2} (11,000 sq ft)	1	1,000 m^{2} (11,000 sq ft)	4 m (13 ft)	4,000 m^{3} (140,000 cu ft)	Including transformer substations
Miscellaneous	10,000 m^{2} (110,000 sq ft)	2	29,000 m^{2} (310,000 sq ft)	3.8 m (12 ft)	112,000 m^{3} (4,000,000 cu ft)	
Total	466,000 m^{2} (5,020,000 sq ft)	-	942,000 m^{2} (10,140,000 sq ft)	-	8,233,000 m^{3} (290,700,000 cu ft)	

==== Agricultural uses ====
Use	Used land area	Number of levels	Total usable area	Height per level	Volume	Notes
Plant growing areas	147,000 m^{2} (1,580,000 sq ft)	3	440,000 m^{2} (4,700,000 sq ft)	15 m (49 ft)	6,600,000 m^{3} (230,000,000 cu ft)	List of crops: 38,000 m^{2} (410,000 sq ft) for sorghum; yield of 83 g/m^{2}/d (0.27 oz/sq ft/d); 235,000 m^{2} (2,530,000 sq ft) for soybeans; yield of 20 g/m^{2}/d (0.066 oz/sq ft/d); 72,000 m^{2} (780,000 sq ft) for wheat; yield of 31 g/m^{2}/d (0.10 oz/sq ft/d); 36,000 m^{2} (390,000 sq ft) for rice; yield of 35 g/m^{2}/d (0.11 oz/sq ft/d); 9,000 m^{2} (97,000 sq ft) for corn; yield of 58 g/m^{2}/d (0.19 oz/sq ft/d); 52,000 m^{2} (560,000 sq ft) for vegetables; yield of 132 g/m^{2}/d (0.43 oz/sq ft/d).; Each of the three agricultural areas in the colony grows the same crops. Part of the plant production is used to feed livestock. Sorghum is used to obtain sugar. Fruit trees are grown in parks and residential areas, providing 250 grams (8.8 oz) of fruit per person each day, and also serving as ornamentation.
Animal areas	17,000 m^{2} (180,000 sq ft)	3	50,000 m^{2} (540,000 sq ft)	15 m (49 ft)	750,000 m^{3} (26,000,000 cu ft)	Stable herd of animals: 260,000 fish (0.1 m^{2} (1.1 sq ft) for each one); 62,000 chickens (0.13 m^{2} (1.4 sq ft) for each one); 28,000 rabbits (0.4 m^{2} (4.3 sq ft) for each one); 1,500 cattle (4 m^{2} (43 sq ft) for each one).; Each one of the three agricultural sections holds around a third of the animals of each species. Flexibility is allowed for other animals to replace parts of these numbers (for example, pigs would have area requirements between those of rabbits and cattle).
Food processing, collection, storage, etc.	13,000 m^{2} (140,000 sq ft)	3	40,000 m^{2} (430,000 sq ft)	15 m (49 ft)	600,000 m^{3} (21,000,000 cu ft)	
Agriculture drying area	27,000 m^{2} (290,000 sq ft)	3	80,000 m^{2} (860,000 sq ft)	15 m (49 ft)	1,200,000 m^{3} (42,000,000 cu ft)	

==== Totals ====
Used land area	Total usable area	Volume	Notes
670,000 m^{2} (7,200,000 sq ft)	1,552,000 m^{2} (16,710,000 sq ft)	17,383,000 m^{3} (613,900,000 cu ft)	Only part of the 678,000 m^{2} (7,300,000 sq ft) of land area and 69,000,000 m^{3} (2.4×10^{9} cu ft) of volume available in the torus are used. The total land area is the result of multiplying the length of the torus at its center (5,215 m (17,110 ft)) by the width at that same point (130 m (430 ft)).

== Construction ==
The torus would require nearly 10 million metric tons (9.8 million long tons; 11 million short tons) of mass. Construction would use materials extracted from the Moon and sent to space using a mass accelerator. A mass catcher at L2 would collect the materials, transporting them to L5 where they could be processed in an industrial facility to construct the torus. Only materials that could not be obtained from the Moon would have to be imported from Earth. Asteroid mining is an alternative source of materials.

== World ship proposal ==
The 2012 paper World Ships – Architectures & Feasibility Revisited proposed a generation ship (also called a world ship) based on the Stanford torus. The Stanford torus was chosen over O'Neill colony designs because of its detailed design that covers in-depth aspects such as life support systems and wall thickness.

Four Stanford torus colonies would be stacked together, each with a population of 25,000 (bigger than the population of 10,000 for the original Stanford torus, while keeping the original general design and dimensions, and almost the same mass, that is increased by only 10% to 11 million tonnes), for a total population of 100,000, the minimum population size that the paper considers for a world ship.

For the propulsion system, an upscaled version of the one designed in Project Daedalus was chosen. A single Daedalus-based system, with a mass of around 500,000 tonnes, would be attached to the centers of the four toruses. Daedalus would provide other additional features, such as power generation (solar energy, as used in the original Stanford Torus, is not available in the interstellar medium through which a world ship travels) and a dust shield to protect the toruses from interstellar dust impacts.

The world ship would also need a fully automatic fail detection and self-repair system, to prevent failures from having catastrophic effects.

== Gallery ==
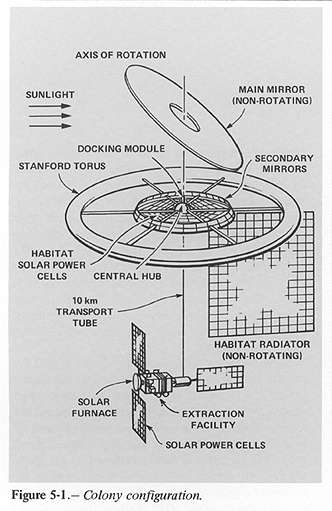
Stanford torus configuration

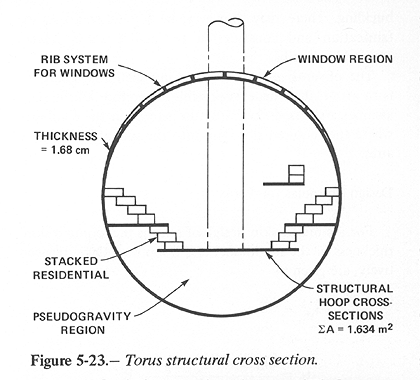
Stanford torus structural cross section

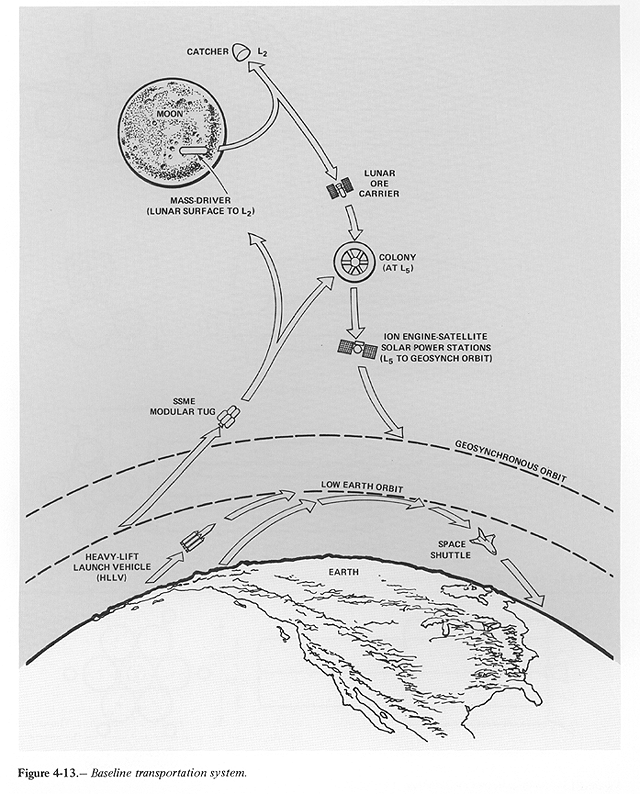
Transportation system for the torus construction (1975)

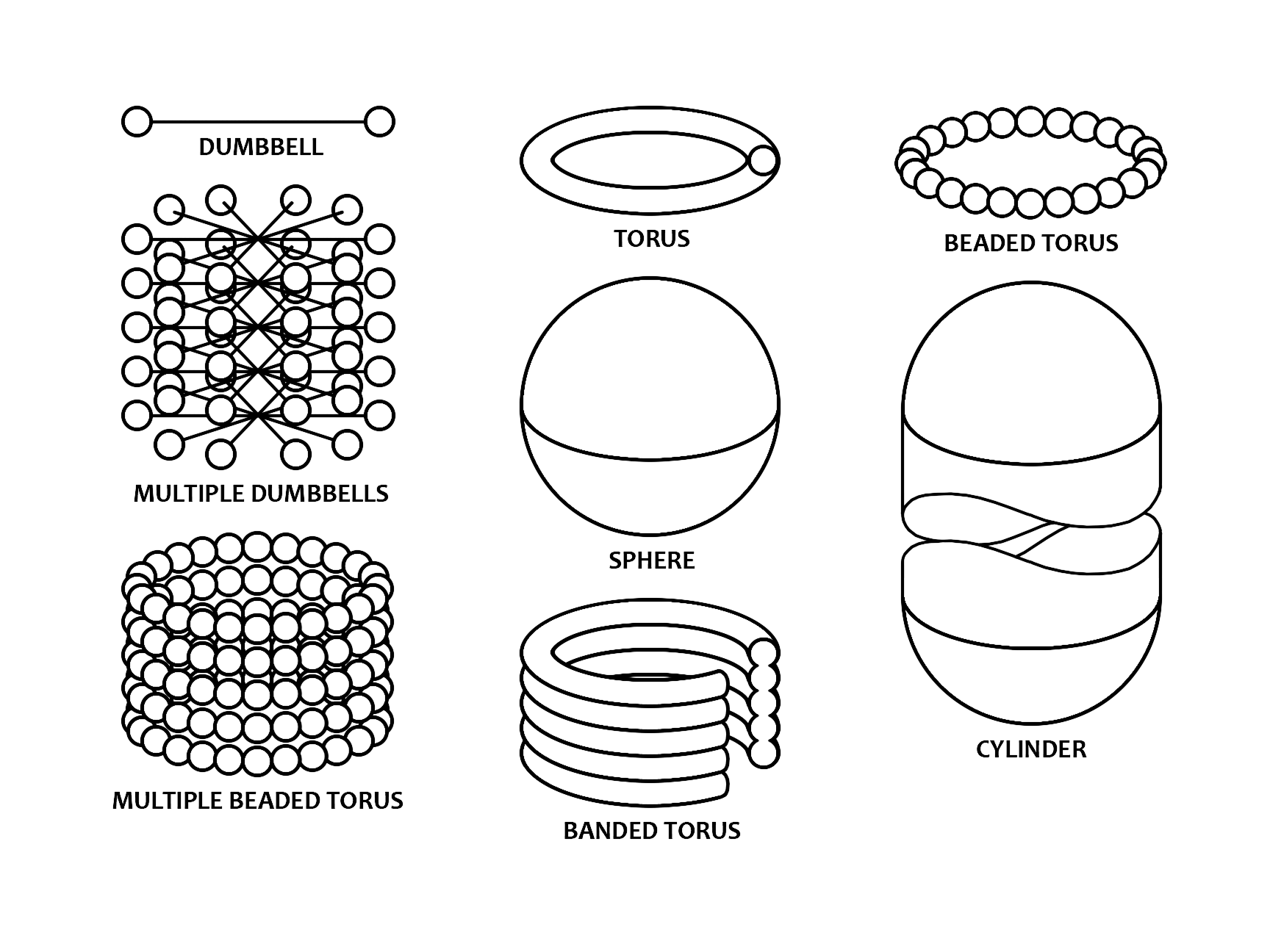
A torus expanding from interconnected bolas or dumbbells

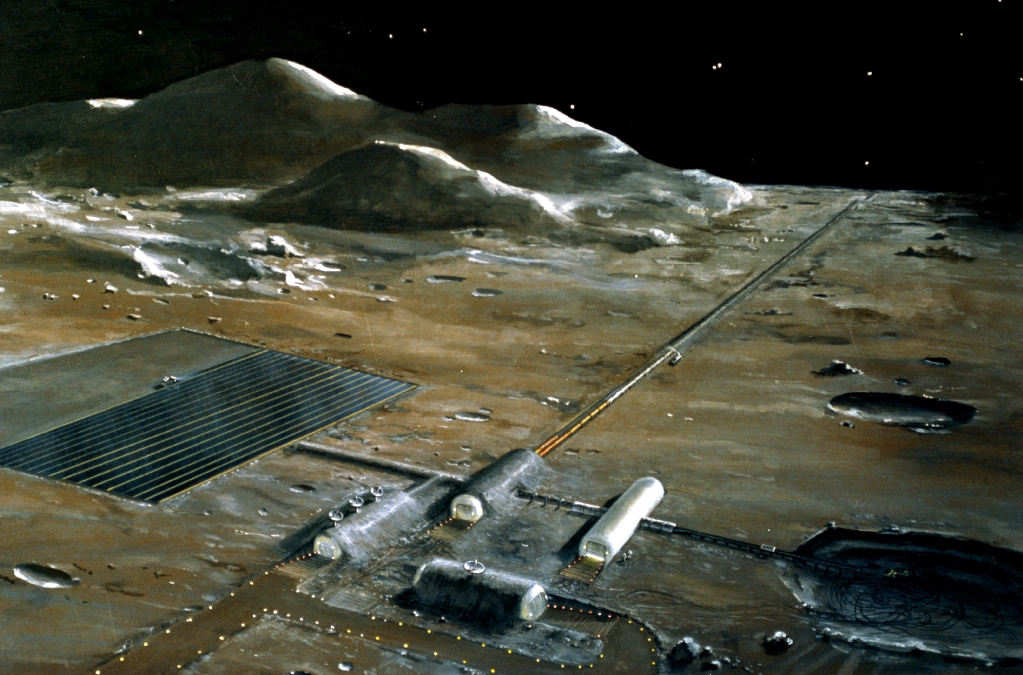
A NASA lunar base concept with a mass driver (the long structure that extends toward the horizon)

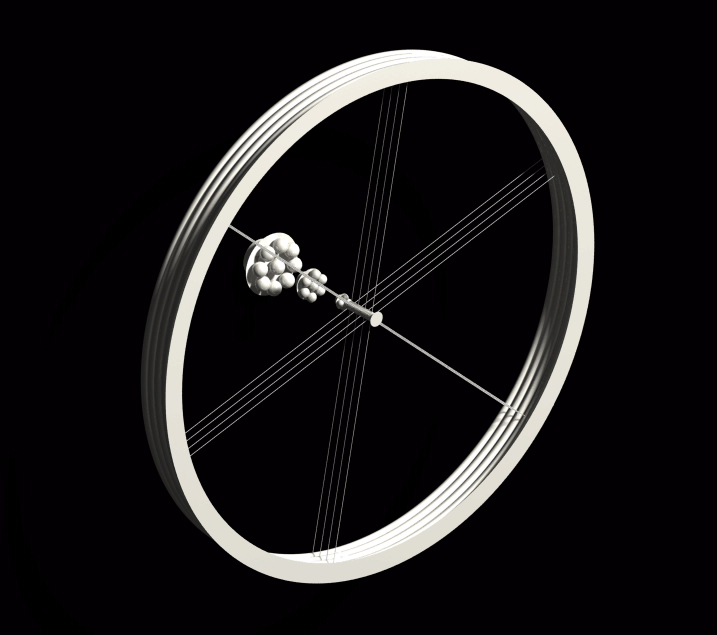
Stanford Torus-based generation ship, proposed by Project Hyperion

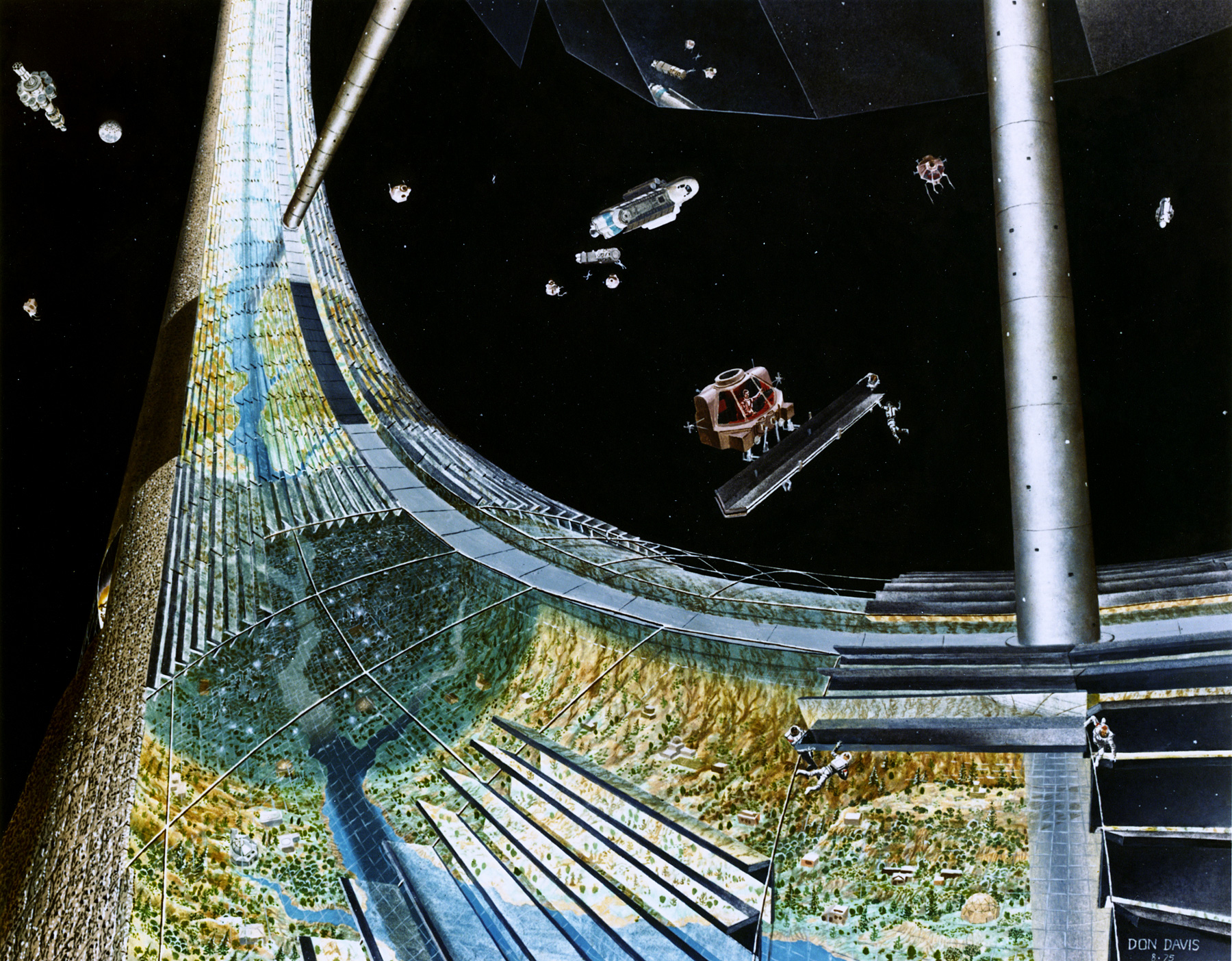
External view of a Stanford torus with some of the radiation-shielding "chevron" mirrors removed to show interior space

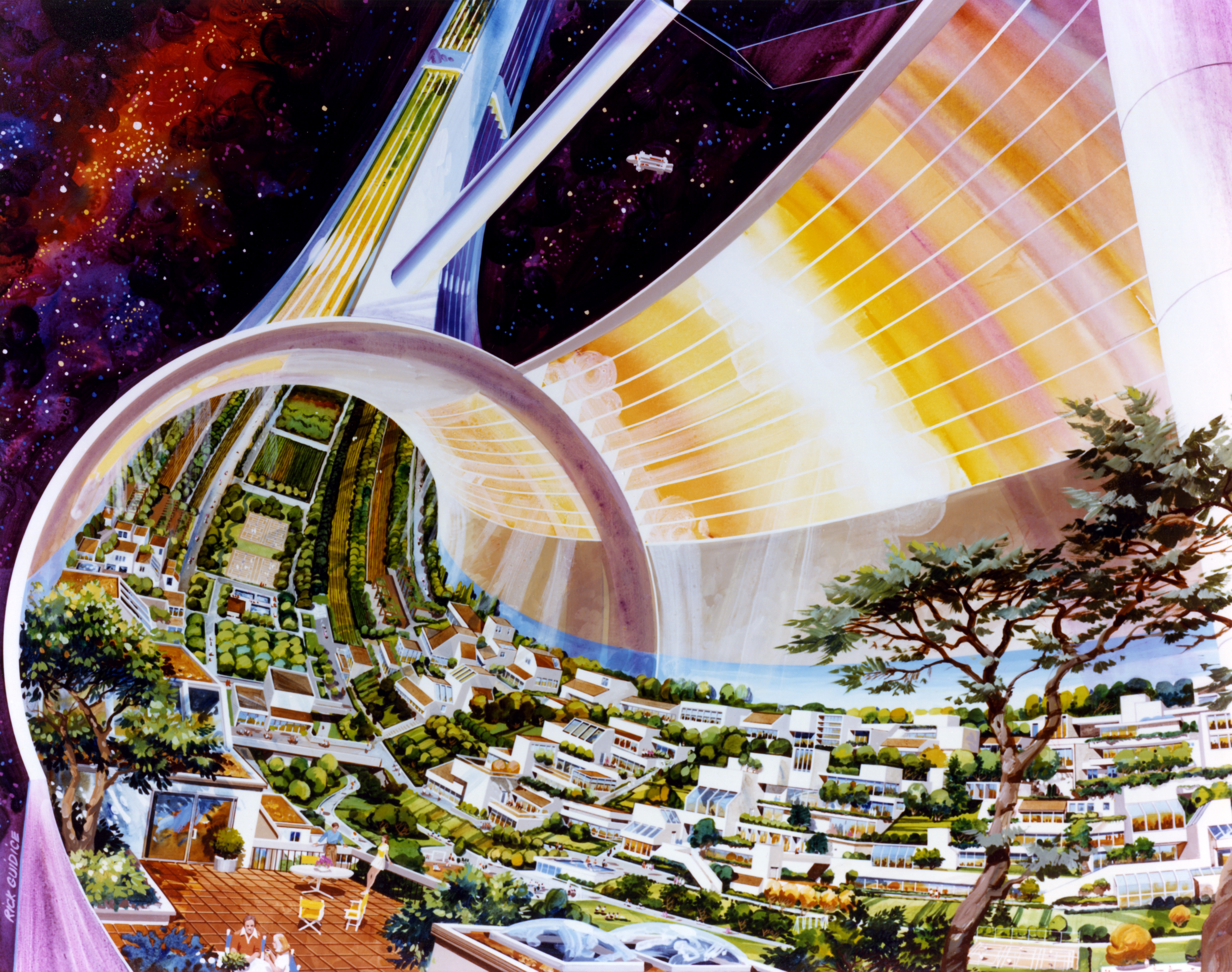
Cutaway view of a Stanford torus

== See also ==
- Asteroid mining
- Bernal sphere
- Bishop Ring (habitat)
- Colonization of the Moon
- Space stations and habitats in fiction
- O'Neill cylinder
- Space colonization
