= Terraforming of Venus =

Engineering the global environment of Venus to make it suitable for humans

Venus
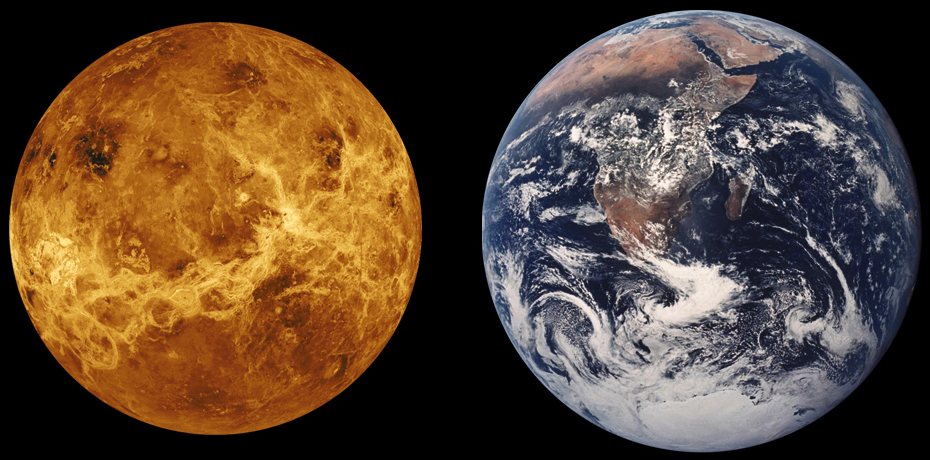
- Scale representations of Venus and the Earth shown next to each other. Venus is only slightly smaller.

Designations
- Pronunciation: /ˈviːnəs/
- Named after: Venus
- Adjectives: Venusian /vɪˈnjuːziən, -ʒən/, rarely Cytherean /sɪθəˈriːən/ or Venerean / Venerian /vɪˈnɪəriən/
- Symbol: ♀

Orbital characteristics
- Epoch J2000
- Aphelion: 0.728213 AU (108.94 million km)
- Perihelion: 0.718440 AU (107.48 million km)
- Semi-major axis: 0.723332 AU (108.21 million km)
- Eccentricity: 0.006772
- Orbital period (sidereal): 224.701 d; 0.615198 Julian year; 0.615187 sidereal year; 1.92 Venus solar day
- Orbital period (synodic): 583.92 days
- Average orbital speed: 35.02 km/s
- Mean anomaly: 50.115°
- Inclination: 3.39458° to ecliptic; 3.86° to Sun's equator; 2.15° to invariable plane
- Longitude of ascending node: 76.680°
- Argument of perihelion: 54.884°
- Satellites: None

Physical characteristics
- Mean radius: 6,051.8±1.0 km; 0.9499 Earths
- Flattening: 0
- Surface area: 4.6023×10^{8} km^{2}; 0.902 Earths
- Volume: 9.2843×10^{11} km^{3}; 0.857 Earths
- Mass: (4.86731±0.00023)×10^{24} kg; 0.815 Earths
- Mean density: 5.243 g/cm^{3}
- Surface gravity: 8.87 m/s^{2} (0.904 g_{0})
- Escape velocity: 10.36 km/s (6.44 mi/s)
- Synodic rotation period: −116.75 d (retrograde); 1 Venus solar day
- Sidereal rotation period: −243.0226 d (retrograde)
- Equatorial rotation velocity: 1.81 m/s
- Axial tilt: 2.64° (for retrograde rotation); 177.36° (to orbit) (Note: Defining the rotation as retrograde, as done by NASA space missions and the USGS, puts Ishtar Terra in the northern hemisphere and makes the axial tilt 2.64°. Following the right-hand rule for prograde rotation puts Ishtar Terra in the negative hemisphere and makes the axial tilt 177.36°.)
- North pole right ascension: 18^{h} 11^{m} 2^{s}; 272.76°
- North pole declination: 67.16°
- Albedo: 0.689 (geometric); 0.76 (Bond)
- Temperature: 232 K (−41 °C) (blackbody temperature)
Surface temp.	min	mean	max
Kelvin		737 K
Celsius		464 °C
Fahrenheit		867 °F
- Surface absorbed dose rate: 2.1×10^{−6} μGy/h
- Surface equivalent dose rate: 2.2×10^{−6} μSv/h; 0.092–22 μSv/h at cloud level
- Apparent magnitude: −4.92 to −2.98
- Absolute magnitude (H): −4.4
- Angular diameter: 9.7″–66.0″

Atmosphere
- Surface pressure: 93 bar (9.3 MPa); 92 atm
- Composition by volume: 96.5% carbon dioxide; 3.5% nitrogen; 0.015% sulphur dioxide; 0.0070% argon; 0.0020% water vapour; 0.0017% carbon monoxide; 0.0012% helium; 0.0007% neon; Trace carbonyl sulfide; Trace hydrogen chloride; Trace hydrogen fluoride

The terraforming of Venus is the hypothetical planetary engineering procedure that would transform Venus from a planet hostile to life to one that could sustainably host humans and other lifeforms free of protection or mediation. Necessary adjustments to the existing environment of Venus to support human life would require a reduction of the planet's surface temperature and a substantial elimination of the planet's dense atmosphere.

At 737 K (464 °C; 867 °F), the surface of Venus is above the melting point of lead. Meanwhile, its 9.2 MPa (91 atm) carbon dioxide and sulfur dioxide atmosphere is almost 100 times as dense as Earth's. These facts are closely interrelated, as Venus's extreme temperature is due to the high pressure of its dense atmosphere and the greenhouse effect. Terraforming would require the removal or conversion of the atmosphere to some other form, alongside the addition of breathable oxygen to the atmosphere.

Proposals to modify the planet include "veiling" the planet from the sun, thus dropping the temperature low enough to condense or solidify carbon dioxide, which would then need to be removed or stored in some way. The rapid growth in carbon capture and storage since the beginning of the century presents another plausible catalyst to terraforming.

== History of the idea ==
Debate over "cosmic pluralism," or life on other worlds, dates to at least ancient Greece, gaining currency with the Renaissance thinker Giordano Bruno. The planet features in virtually every recorded human culture, given its visibility.

Olaf Stapledon, a philosopher and author, described the terraforming of Venus in his 1930 novel "Last and First Men" In the 1950s, colonization of Venus appeared alongside proposals for the Moon and Mars before it gradually fell out of fashion when the prohibitive costs and engineering hurdles became apparent. Poul Anderson, a successful science fiction writer, had proposed the idea in his 1954 novelette "The Big Rain", a story belonging to his Psychotechnic League future history. The first known suggestion to terraform Venus in a scholarly context was by the astronomer Carl Sagan in 1961.

Prior to the early 1960s, the atmosphere of Venus was believed by many astronomers to have an Earth-like temperature. When Venus was understood to have a thick carbon dioxide atmosphere with a consequence of a very large greenhouse effect, some scientists began to contemplate the idea of altering the atmosphere to make the surface more Earth-like. In the final section of an article in the journal Science in 1961, Carl Sagan discussed these effects and proposed injecting photosynthetic bacteria into the atmosphere of Venus. He argued that this would convert the carbon dioxide into reduced carbon in organic form, thus reducing the carbon dioxide from the atmosphere.

The knowledge of Venus's atmosphere was still inexact when Sagan first prosed this. Thirty-three years later, in his 1994 book Pale Blue Dot, Sagan conceded his original proposal for terraforming would not work because the atmosphere of Venus is far denser than was known in 1961:

"Here's the fatal flaw: In 1961, I thought the atmospheric pressure at the surface of Venus was a few bars ... We now know it to be 90 bars, so if the scheme worked, the result would be a surface buried in hundreds of meters of fine graphite, and an atmosphere made of 65 bars of almost pure molecular oxygen. Whether we would first implode under the atmospheric pressure or spontaneously burst into flames in all that oxygen is open to question. However, long before so much oxygen could build up, the graphite would spontaneously burn back into CO_{2}, short-circuiting the process."

Following Sagan's paper, there was little scientific discussion of the concept until a resurgence of interest in the 1970s and 1980s. Despite its formidable atmosphere, the bulk mass and density characteristics of Venus relative to Earth make it in many ways a more attractive terraforming target than Mars or the solar system's natural satellites. Adrian Berry devoted chapters to the subject in his The Next Ten Thousand Years: A Vision of Man's Future in the Universe (1974). Marchal proposed colonization of the polar regions in 1983 via the "pulverization" of nearby asteroids with nuclear processes.

== Atmosphere reduction ==
A number of approaches to terraforming are reviewed by Martyn J. Fogg (1995) and by Geoffrey A. Landis (2011).

The main problem with Venus today, from a terraformation standpoint, is the very thick carbon dioxide atmosphere. The ground level pressure of Venus is 9.2 MPa (91 atm; 1,330 psi). This also, through the greenhouse effect, causes the temperature on the surface to be several hundred degrees too hot for any significant organisms. Therefore, all approaches to the terraforming of Venus include somehow removing almost all the carbon dioxide in the atmosphere.

=== Biological approaches ===
The method proposed in 1961 by Carl Sagan involves the use of genetically engineered algae to fix carbon into organic compounds. Although this method is still proposed in discussions of Venus terraforming, later discoveries showed that biological means alone would not be successful.

Difficulties include the fact that the production of organic molecules from carbon dioxide requires hydrogen, which is very rare on Venus. Because Venus lacks a protective magnetosphere, the upper atmosphere is exposed to direct erosion by the solar wind and has lost most of its original hydrogen to space. And, as Sagan noted, any carbon that was bound up in organic molecules would quickly be converted to carbon dioxide again by the hot surface environment. Venus would not begin to cool down until after most of the carbon dioxide had already been removed.

=== Capture in carbonates ===
On Earth nearly all carbon is sequestered in the form of carbonate minerals or in different stages of the carbon cycle, while very little is present in the atmosphere in the form of carbon dioxide. On Venus, the situation is the opposite. Much of the carbon is present in the atmosphere, while comparatively little is sequestered in the lithosphere. Many approaches to terraforming therefore focus on getting rid of carbon dioxide by chemical reactions trapping and stabilising it in the form of carbonate minerals.

Modelling by astrobiologists Mark Bullock and David Grinspoon of Venus's atmospheric evolution suggests that the equilibrium between the current 92-bar atmosphere and existing surface minerals, particularly calcium and magnesium oxides, is quite unstable, and that the latter could serve as a sink of carbon dioxide and sulfur dioxide through conversion to carbonates. If these surface minerals were fully converted and saturated, then the atmospheric pressure would decline and the planet would cool somewhat. One of the possible end states modelled by Bullock and Grinspoon was an atmosphere of 43 bars (42 atm; 620 psi) and a surface temperature of 400 K (127 °C; 260 °F). To convert the rest of the carbon dioxide in the atmosphere, a larger portion of the crust would have to be artificially exposed to the atmosphere to allow more extensive carbonate conversion. In 1989, Alexander G. Smith proposed that Venus could be terraformed by lithosphere overturn, allowing crust to be converted into carbonates. Landis 2011 calculated that it would require the involvement of the entire surface crust down to a depth of over 1 km to produce enough rock surface area to convert enough of the atmosphere.

Natural formation of carbonate rock from minerals and carbon dioxide is a very slow process. Recent research into sequestering carbon dioxide into carbonate minerals in the context of mitigating global warming on Earth however points out that this process can be considerably accelerated (from hundreds or thousands of years to just 75 days) through the use of catalysts such as polystyrene microspheres. It could therefore be theorised that similar technologies might also be used in the context of terraformation on Venus. It can also be noted that the chemical reaction that converts minerals and carbon dioxide into carbonates is exothermic, in essence producing more energy than is consumed by the reaction. This opens up the possibility of creating self-reinforcing conversion processes with potential for exponential growth of the conversion rate until most of the atmospheric carbon dioxide can be converted.

Bombardment of Venus with refined magnesium and calcium from off-world could also sequester carbon dioxide in the form of calcium and magnesium carbonates. About 8×10^{20} kg of calcium or 5×10^{20} kg of magnesium would be required to convert all the carbon dioxide in the atmosphere, which would entail a great deal of mining and mineral refining (perhaps on Mercury which is notably mineral rich). 8×10^{20} kg is a few times the mass of the asteroid 4 Vesta (more than 500 kilometres (310 mi) in diameter).

=== Injection into volcanic basalt rock ===
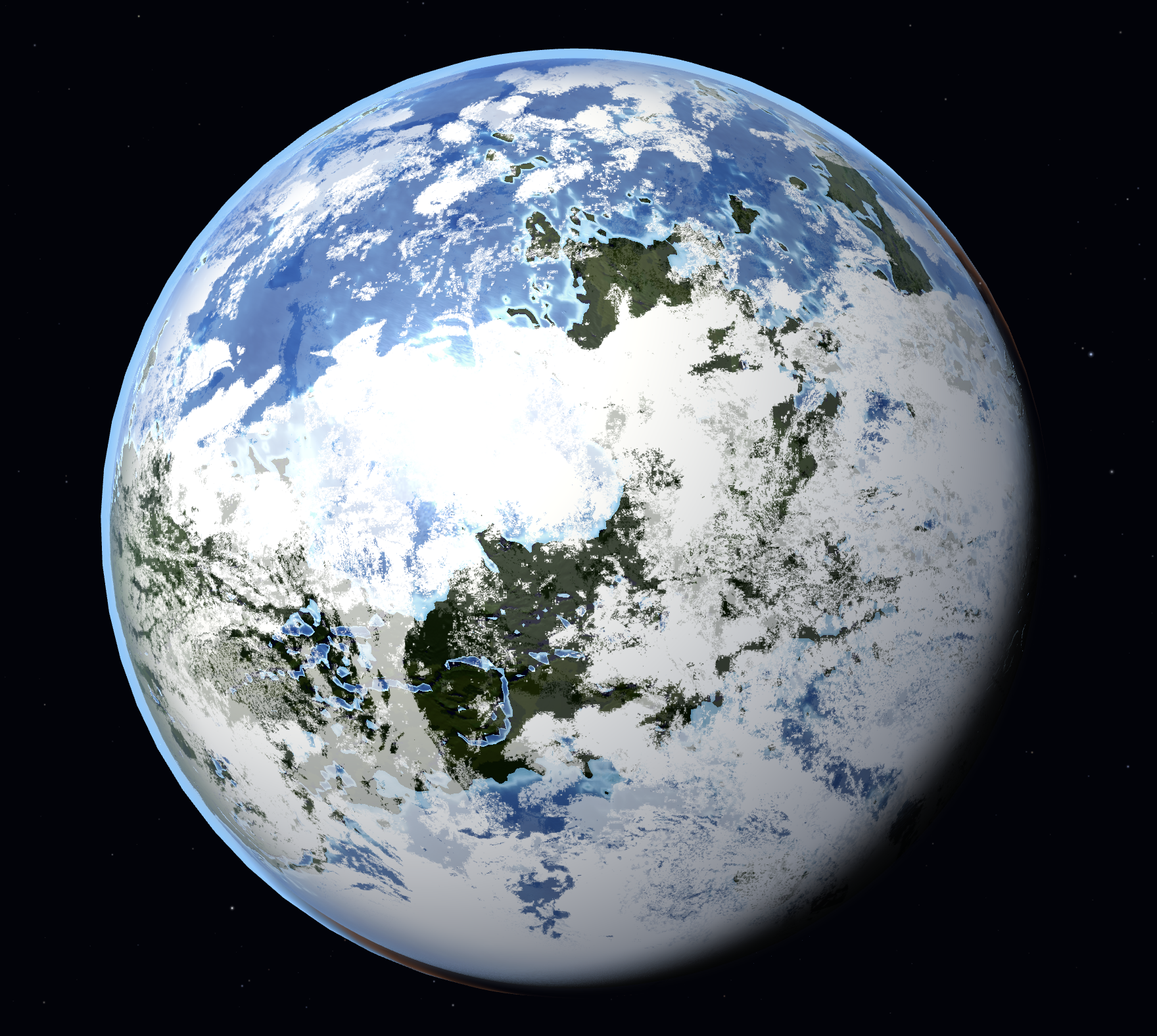
Artist's conception of a terraformed Venus, centered around Aphrodite Terra.

Research projects in Iceland and the US state of Washington have shown that potentially large amounts of carbon dioxide could be removed from the atmosphere by high-pressure injection into subsurface porous basalt formations, where carbon dioxide is rapidly transformed into solid inert minerals.

Other studies predict that one cubic meter of porous basalt has the potential to sequester 47 kilograms of injected carbon dioxide. According to these estimates a volume of about 9.86 billion km^{3} of basalt rock would be needed to sequester all the carbon dioxide in the Venusian atmosphere. This is equal to the entire crust of Venus down to a depth of about 21.4 kilometers. Another study concluded that under optimal conditions, on average, 1 cubic meter of basalt rock can sequester 260 kg of carbon dioxide. Venus's crust appears to be 70 kilometres (43 mi) thick and the planet is dominated by volcanic features. The surface is about 90% basalt, and about 65% consists of a mosaic of volcanic lava plains. There should therefore be ample volumes of basalt rock strata on the planet with very promising potential for carbon dioxide sequestration.

Research has also demonstrated that under the high temperature and high pressure conditions in the mantle, silicon dioxide, the most abundant mineral in the mantle (on Earth and probably also on Venus) can form carbonates that are stable under these conditions. This opens up the possibility of carbon dioxide sequestration in the mantle.

=== Introduction of hydrogen ===
According to Birch, bombarding Venus with hydrogen and reacting it with carbon dioxide could produce elemental carbon (graphite) and water by the Bosch reaction. It would take about 4 × 10^{19} kg of hydrogen to convert the whole Venusian atmosphere, and such a large amount of hydrogen could be obtained from the gas giants or their moons' ice. Another possible source of hydrogen could be somehow extracting it from possible reservoirs in the interior of the planet itself. According to some researchers, the Earth's mantle and/or core might hold large quantities of hydrogen left there since the original formation of Earth from the nebular cloud. Since the original formation and inner structure of Earth and Venus are generally believed to be somewhat similar, the same might be true for Venus.

Iron aerosol in the atmosphere will also be required for the reaction to work, and iron can come from Mercury, asteroids, or the Moon. (Loss of hydrogen due to the solar wind is unlikely to be significant on the timescale of terraforming.) Due to the planet's relatively flat surface, this water would cover about 80% of the surface, compared to 70% for Earth, even though it would amount to only roughly 10% of the water found on Earth.

The remaining atmosphere, at around 3 bars (about three times that of Earth), would mainly be composed of nitrogen, some of which will dissolve into the new oceans of water, reducing atmospheric pressure in accordance with Henry's law. To further reduce the pressure even more, nitrogen could also be fixated into nitrates.

Futurist Isaac Arthur has suggested using the hypothesized processes of starlifting and stellasing to create a particle beam of ionized hydrogen from the sun, tentatively dubbed a "hydro-cannon". This device could be used both to thin the dense atmosphere of Venus, but also to introduce hydrogen to react with carbon dioxide to create water, thereby further lowering the atmospheric pressure.

=== Direct removal of atmosphere ===
The thinning of the Venusian atmosphere could be attempted by a variety of methods, possibly in combination. Directly lifting atmospheric gas from Venus into space would probably prove difficult. Venus has sufficiently high escape velocity to make blasting it away with asteroid impacts impractical. Pollack and Sagan calculated in 1994 that an impactor of 700 km diameter striking Venus at greater than 20 km/s, would eject all the atmosphere above the horizon as seen from the point of impact, but because this is less than a thousandth of the total atmosphere and there would be diminishing returns as the atmosphere's density decreases, a very great number of such giant impactors would be required. Landis calculated that to lower the pressure from 92 bar to 1 bar would require a minimum of 2,000 impacts, even if the efficiency of atmosphere removal was perfect. Smaller objects would not work, either, because more would be required. The violence of the bombardment could well result in significant outgassing that would replace removed atmosphere. Most of the ejected atmosphere would go into solar orbit near Venus, and, without further intervention, could be captured by the Venerian gravitational field and become part of the atmosphere once again.

Another variant method involving bombardment would be to perturb a massive Kuiper belt object to put its orbit onto a collision path with Venus. If the object, made of mostly ices, had enough velocity to penetrate just a few kilometers past the Venusian surface, the resulting forces from the vaporization of ice from the impactor and the impact itself could stir the lithosphere and mantle thus ejecting a proportional amount of matter (as magma and gas) from Venus. A by-product of this method would be either a new moon for Venus or a new impactor-body of debris that would fall back to the surface at a later time.

Removal of atmospheric gas in a more controlled manner could also prove difficult. Venus's extremely slow rotation means that space elevators would be very difficult to construct because the planet's geostationary orbit lies an impractical distance above the surface, and the very thick atmosphere to be removed makes mass drivers useless for removing payloads from the planet's surface. Possible workarounds include placing mass drivers on high-altitude balloons or balloon-supported towers extending above the bulk of the atmosphere, using space fountains, or rotovators.

In addition, if the density of the atmosphere (and corresponding greenhouse effect) were dramatically reduced, the surface temperature (now effectively constant) would probably vary widely between day side and night side. Another side effect to atmospheric-density reduction could be the creation of zones of dramatic weather activity or storms at the terminator because large volumes of atmosphere would undergo rapid heating or cooling.

== Cooling planet ==
Venus receives about twice the sunlight that Earth does, which is thought to have contributed to its runaway greenhouse effect. One means of terraforming Venus could involve reducing the insolation at Venus's surface to prevent the planet from heating up again.

=== Space-based ===
Solar shades could be used to reduce the total insolation received by Venus, cooling the planet somewhat. A shade placed in the Sun–Venus L_{1} Lagrangian point also would serve to block the solar wind, removing the radiation exposure problem on Venus.

A suitably large solar shade would be four times the diameter of Venus itself if at the L_{1} point. This would necessitate construction in space. There would also be the difficulty of balancing a thin-film shade perpendicular to the Sun's rays at the Sun–Venus Lagrange point with the incoming radiation pressure, which would tend to turn the shade into a huge solar sail. If the shade were simply left at the L_{1} point, the pressure would add force to the sunward side and the shade would accelerate and drift out of orbit. The shade could instead be positioned nearer to the Sun, using the solar pressure to balance the gravitational forces, in practice becoming a statite.

Other modifications to the L_{1} solar shade design have also been suggested to solve the solar-sail problem. One suggested method is to use polar-orbiting, solar-synchronous mirrors that reflect light toward the back of the sunshade, from the non-sunward side of Venus. Photon pressure would push the support mirrors to an angle of 30 degrees away from the sunward side.

Paul Birch proposed a slatted system of mirrors near the L_{1} point between Venus and the Sun. The shade's panels would not be perpendicular to the Sun's rays, but instead at an angle of 30 degrees, such that the reflected light would strike the next panel, negating the photon pressure. Each successive row of panels would be +/- 1 degree off the 30-degree deflection angle, causing the reflected light to be skewed 4 degrees from striking Venus.

Solar shades could also serve as solar power generators. Space-based solar shade techniques, and thin-film solar sails in general, are only in an early stage of development. The vast sizes require a quantity of material that is many orders of magnitude greater than any human-made object that has ever been brought into space or constructed in space.

=== Atmospheric or surface-based ===
Venus could also be cooled by placing reflectors in the atmosphere. Reflective balloons floating in the upper atmosphere could create shade. The number and/or size of the balloons would necessarily be great. Geoffrey A. Landis has suggested that if enough floating cities were built, they could form a solar shield around the planet, and could simultaneously be used to process the atmosphere into a more desirable form, thus combining the solar shield theory and the atmospheric processing theory with a scalable technology that would immediately provide living space in the Venusian atmosphere. If made from carbon nanotubes or graphene (a sheet-like carbon allotrope), then the major structural materials can be produced using carbon dioxide gathered in situ from the atmosphere. The recently synthesised amorphous carbonia might prove a useful structural material if it can be quenched to Standard Temperature and Pressure (STP) conditions, perhaps in a mixture with regular silica glass. According to Birch's analysis, such colonies and materials would provide an immediate economic return from colonizing Venus, funding further terraforming efforts.

Increasing the planet's albedo by deploying light-colored or reflective material on the surface (or at any level below the cloud tops) would not be useful, because the Venerian surface is already completely enshrouded by clouds, and almost no sunlight reaches the surface. Thus, it would be unlikely to be able to reflect more light than Venus's already-reflective clouds, with Bond albedo of 0.77.

=== Combination of solar shades and atmospheric condensation ===
Birch proposed that solar shades could be used to not merely cool the planet but to also reduce atmospheric pressure as well, by the process of freezing of the carbon dioxide. This requires Venus's temperature to be reduced, first to the liquefaction point, requiring a temperature less than 304.128(15) K (30.978(15) °C or 87.761(27) °F) and partial pressures of CO_{2} to bring the atmospheric pressure down to 73.773(30) bar (carbon dioxide's critical point); and from there reducing the temperature below 216.592(3) K (−56.558(3) °C or −69.8044(54) °F) (carbon dioxide's triple point). Below that temperature, freezing of atmospheric carbon dioxide into dry ice will cause it to deposit onto the surface. He then proposed that the frozen CO_{2} could be buried and maintained in that condition by pressure, or even shipped off-world (perhaps to provide greenhouse gas needed for terraforming of Mars or the moons of Jupiter). After this process was complete, the shades could be removed or solettas added, allowing the planet to partially warm again to temperatures comfortable for Earth life. A source of hydrogen or water would still be needed, and some of the remaining 3.5 bar of atmospheric nitrogen would need to be fixed into the soil. Birch suggests disrupting an icy moon of Saturn, for example Hyperion, and bombarding Venus with its fragments.

=== Cooling planet by heat pipes, atmospheric vortex engines or radiative cooling ===
Paul Birch suggests that, in addition to cooling the planet with a sunshade in L1, "heat pipes" could be built on the planet to accelerate the cooling. The proposed mechanism would transport heat from the surface to colder regions higher up in the atmosphere, similar to a solar updraft tower, thereby facilitating radiation of excess heat out into space. A newly proposed variation of this technology is the atmospheric vortex engine, where instead of physical chimney pipes, the atmospheric updraft is achieved through the creation of a vortex, similar to a stationary tornado. In addition to this method being less material intensive and potentially more cost effective, this process also produces a net surplus of energy, which could be utilised to power venusian colonies or other aspects of the terraforming effort, while simultaneously contributing to speeding up the cooling of the planet. Another method to cool down the planet could be with the use of radiative cooling This technology could utilise the fact that in certain wavelengths, thermal radiation from the lower atmosphere of Venus can "escape" to space through partially transparent atmospheric "windows" – spectral gaps between strong CO_{2} and H_{2}O absorption bands in the near infrared range 0.8–2.4 μm (31–94 μin). The outgoing thermal radiation is wavelength dependent and varies from the very surface at 1 μm (39 μin) to approximately 35 km (22 mi) at 2.3 μm (91 μin). Nanophotonics and construction of metamaterials opens up new possibilities to tailor the emittance spectrum of a surface via properly designing periodic nano/micro-structures. Recently there has been proposals of a device named a "emissive energy harvester" that can transfer heat to space through radiative cooling and convert part of the heat flow into surplus energy, opening up possibilities of a self-replicating system that could exponentially cool the planet.

== Introduction of water ==
Since Venus has only a fraction of the water of Earth (less than half the Earth's water content in the atmosphere, and none on the surface), water would have to be introduced either by the aforementioned method of introduction of hydrogen, or from some other interplanetary or extraplanetary source.

=== Capture the Ice Moons ===
Paul Birch suggests the possibility of colliding Venus with one of the ice moons from the outer solar system, thereby bringing in all the water needed for terraformation in one go. This could be achieved through gravity assisted capture of Saturn's moons Enceladus and Hyperion or the Uranian moon Miranda. Simply changing the velocity of these moons enough to move them from their current orbit and enable gravity-assisted transport to Venus would require large amounts of energy. However, through complex gravity-assisted chain reactions the propulsion requirements could be reduced by several orders of magnitude. As Birch puts it, "[t]heoretically one could flick a pebble into the asteroid belt and end up dumping Mars into the Sun."

=== Outgassing from the mantle ===
Studies have shown that substantial amounts of water (in the form of hydrogen) might be present in the mantle of terrestrial planets. An early, shallow liquid water Venetian ocean has been hypothesized, perhaps existing as much as two billion years ago. Data from the European Space Agency (ESA) Venus Express satellite suggested this early ocean could have had liquid water and thus been habitable. New simulations using this previous data have been created at NASA's Goddard Institute for Space Studies in New York suggesting much the same.

NASA reports it may have covered the surface of Venus. Dry land near the equator would have limited the evaporation of oceans and the greenhouse effect, allowing liquid water to have persisted for some time. However, recent studies of Venus's atmosphere and interior suggest that Venusian surface water evaporated prior to 3 billion years ago or never existed. The early existence of an ocean and future human efforts to extract potential water from the mantle are currently speculative.

== Altering day–night cycle ==
Venus rotates once every 243 Earth days—by far the slowest rotation period of any known object in the Solar System. A Venusian sidereal day thus lasts more than a Venusian year (243 versus 224.7 Earth days). However, the length of a solar day on Venus is significantly shorter than the sidereal day; to an observer on the surface of Venus, the time from one sunrise to the next would be 116.75 days. Therefore, the slow Venerian rotation rate would result in extremely long days and nights, similar to the day-night cycles in the polar regions of earth—shorter, but global. The exact period of a solar day is very important for terraforming since 117 days of daytime would be the equivalent of a summer in the more temperate regions of Alaska whereas 58 days of daytime would result in a very short growing season found in the high arctic. It could mean the difference between permafrost and perpetual ice or green lush boreal forests. The slow rotation might also account for the lack of a significant magnetic field.

=== Arguments for keeping the current day-night cycle unchanged ===
It has until recently been assumed that the rotation rate or day-night cycle of Venus would have to be increased for successful terraformation to be achieved. More recent research has shown, however, that the current slow rotation rate of Venus is not at all detrimental to the planet's capability to support an Earth-like climate. Rather, the slow rotation rate would, given an Earth-like atmosphere, enable the formation of thick cloud layers on the side of the planet facing the sun. This in turn would raise planetary albedo and act to cool the global temperature to Earth-like levels, despite the greater proximity to the Sun. According to calculations, maximum temperatures would be just around 35 °C (95 °F), given an Earth-like atmosphere. Speeding up the rotation rate would therefore be both impractical and detrimental to the terraforming effort. A terraformed Venus with the current slow rotation would result in a global climate with "day" and "night" periods each roughly 2 months (58 days) long, resembling the seasons at higher latitudes on Earth. The "day" would resemble a short summer with a warm, humid climate, a heavy overcast sky and ample rainfall. The "night" would resemble a short, very dark winter with quite cold temperature and snowfall. There would be periods with more temperate climate and clear weather at sunrise and sunset resembling a "spring" and "autumn".

=== Space mirrors ===
The problem of very dark conditions during the roughly two-month long "night" period could be solved through the use of a space mirror in a 24-hour orbit (the same distance as a geostationary orbit on Earth) similar to the Znamya (satellite) project experiments. Extrapolating the numbers from those experiments and applying them to Venerian conditions would mean that a space mirror just under 1700 meters in diameter could illuminate the entire nightside of the planet with the luminosity of 10-20 full moons and create an artificial 24-hour light cycle. An even bigger mirror could potentially create even stronger illumination conditions. Further extrapolation suggests that to achieve illumination levels of about 400 lux (similar to normal office lighting or a sunrise on a clear day on earth) a circular mirror about 55 kilometers across would be needed.

Paul Birch suggested keeping the entire planet protected from sunlight by a permanent system of slated shades in L1, and the surface illuminated by a rotating soletta mirror in a polar orbit, which would produce a 24-hour light cycle.

=== Changing rotation speed ===
If increasing the rotation speed of the planet would be desired (despite the above-mentioned potentially positive climatic effects of the current rotational speed), it would require energy of a magnitude many orders greater than the construction of orbiting solar mirrors, or even than the removal of the Venerian atmosphere. Birch calculates that increasing the rotation of Venus to an Earth-like solar cycle would require about 1.6 × 10^{29} Joules (50 billion petawatt-hours).

Scientific research suggests that close flybys of asteroids or cometary bodies larger than 100 kilometres (60 mi) across could be used to move a planet in its orbit, or increase the speed of rotation. The energy required to do this is large. In his book on terraforming, one of the concepts Fogg discusses is to increase the spin of Venus using three quadrillion objects circulating between Venus and the Sun every 2 hours, each traveling at 10% of the speed of light.

G. David Nordley has suggested, in fiction, that Venus might be spun up to a day length of 30 Earth days by exporting the atmosphere of Venus into space via mass drivers. A proposal by Birch involves the use of dynamic compression members to transfer energy and momentum via high-velocity mass streams to a band around the equator of Venus. He calculated that a sufficiently high-velocity mass stream, at about 10% of the speed of light, could give Venus a day of 24 hours in 30 years.

== Creating an artificial magnetosphere ==
Protecting the new atmosphere from the solar wind, to avoid the loss of hydrogen, would require an artificial magnetosphere. Venus presently lacks an intrinsic magnetic field, therefore creating an artificial planetary magnetic field is needed to form a magnetosphere via its interaction with the solar wind. According to two NIFS Japanese scientists, it is feasible to do that with current technology by building a system of refrigerated latitudinal superconducting rings, each carrying a sufficient amount of direct current. In the same report, it is claimed that the economic impact of the system can be minimized by using it also as a planetary energy transfer and storage system (SMES).

Another study proposes the possibility of deployment of a magnetic dipole shield at the L1 Lagrange point, thereby creating an artificial magnetosphere that would protect the whole planet from solar wind and radiation.

== Colonization of Venus ==
Stephen Hawking has claimed that space colonization is the best way to ensure the survival of humans as a species. Other reasons for colonizing space include economic interests, long-term scientific research best carried out by humans as opposed to robotic probes, and sheer curiosity. Venus is the second largest terrestrial planet and Earth's closest neighbor, which makes it a potential target. Bulk similarities, particularly its mass, and distance from the Sun make it a better target than other frequently mentioned bodies such as the Moon and Mars leading to its sobriquet "sister planet."

Over 20 successful space missions have visited Venus since 1962. The last European probe was ESA's Venus Express, which was in polar orbit around the planet from 2006 to 2014. A Japanese probe, Akatsuki, failed in its first attempt to orbit Venus, but successfully reinserted itself into orbit on 7 December 2015. Other low-cost missions have been proposed to further explore the planet's atmosphere, as the area 50 km (31 mi) above the surface where gas pressure is at the same level as Earth, has not yet been thoroughly explored. In 2015, NASA developed the High Altitude Venus Operational Concept (HAVOC) for exploring the possibility of an atmospheric crewed mission. They also planned a hypothetical float sky station with key supplies and communication.

=== Advantages ===
In contrast to Mars, Venus is close in size and mass to the Earth, resulting in a surface gravity (0.904 g) that would likely be sufficient to prevent the health problems associated with weightlessness. Most other space exploration and colonization plans face concerns about the damaging effect of long-term exposure to fractional g or zero gravity on the human musculoskeletal system. The crushing atmosphere and greenhouse temperatures, discussed above, remain the main impediments.

Venus's relative proximity makes transportation and communications easier than for most other locations in the Solar System. With current propulsion systems, launch windows to Venus occur every 584 days, compared to the 780 days for Mars. Flight time is also somewhat shorter; the Venus Express probe that arrived at Venus in April 2006 spent slightly over five months en route, compared to nearly six months for Mars Express. This is because at closest approach, Venus is 40 million km (25 million mi) from Earth (approximated by perihelion of Earth minus aphelion of Venus) compared to 55 million km (34 million mi) for Mars (approximated by perihelion of Mars minus aphelion of Earth) making Venus the closest planet to Earth.

Additionally, the upper atmosphere could provide protection from harmful solar radiation comparable to the protection provided by Earth's atmosphere. The atmosphere of Mars, as well as the Moon provide little such protection.

=== Difficulties ===
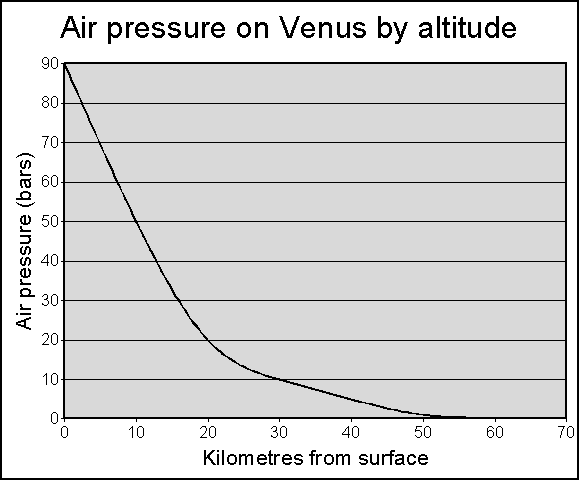
Air pressure on Venus, beginning at a pressure on the surface 90 times that of Earth and reaching a single bar by 50 kilometers

Venus also presents several significant challenges to human colonization. Surface conditions on Venus are difficult to deal with: the temperature averages around 464 °C (737 K; 867 °F), higher than the melting point of lead, which is 327 °C (600 K; 621 °F). The atmospheric pressure on the surface is also at least ninety times greater than on Earth, which is equivalent to the pressure experienced under a kilometer of water on Earth. These conditions have caused missions to the surface to be extremely brief: the Soviet Venera 5 and Venera 6 probes were crushed by high pressure while still 18 km above the surface. Following landers such as Venera 7 and Venera 8 succeeded in transmitting data after reaching the surface, but these missions were brief as well, surviving no more than an hour on the surface.

The visible clouds of Venus are composed of corrosive sulfuric acid and sulfur dioxide vapor. Structural and industrial materials would be hard to retrieve from the surface and expensive to bring from Earth or from asteroids. The sulfuric acid poses a further challenge in that the colony would need to be constructed of or coated in materials resistant to corrosion by the acid, such as PTFE (a compound consisting wholly of carbon and fluorine).

=== Aerostat habitats and floating cities ===
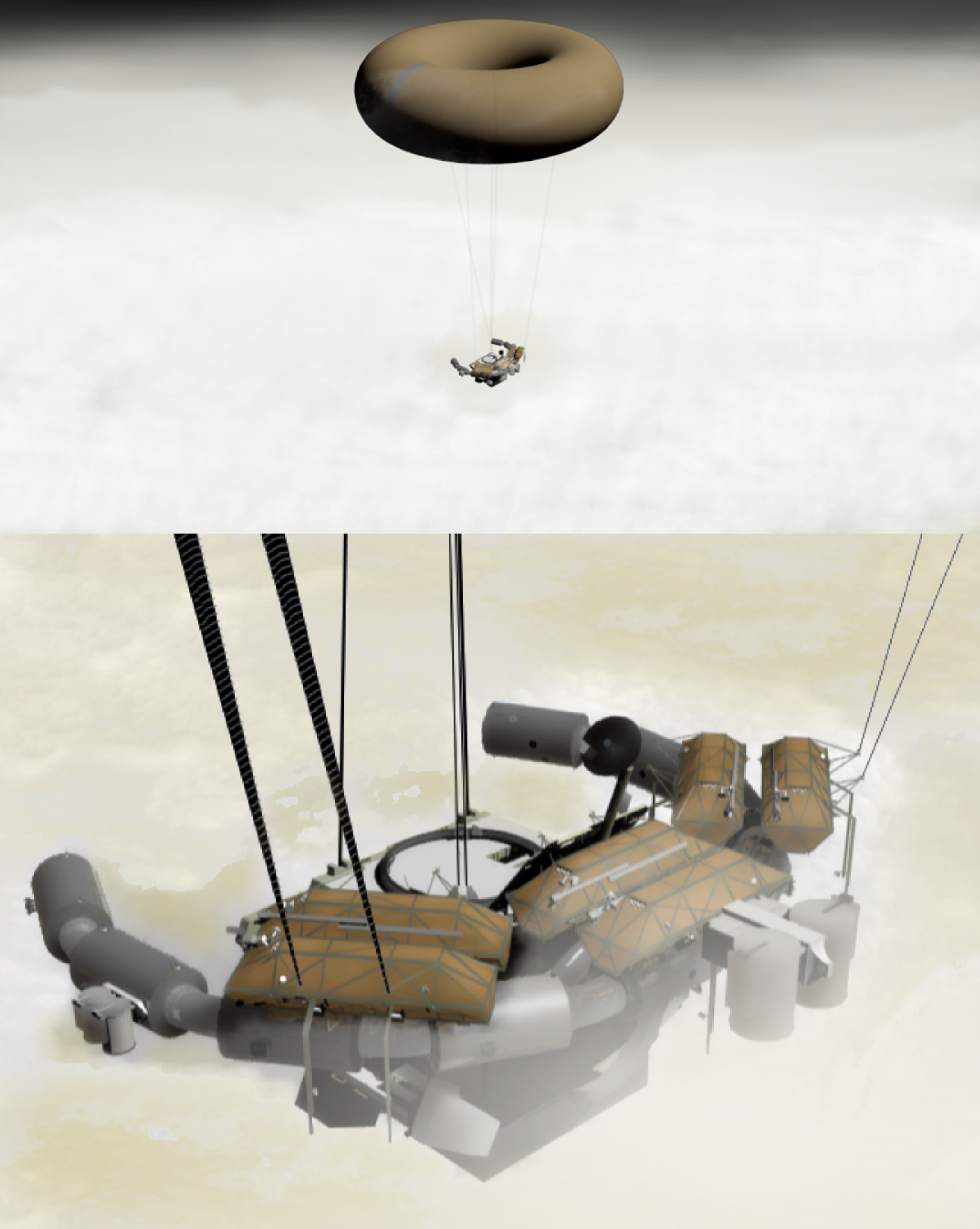
Hypothetical floating outpost studying habitation of Venus around 50 km above the surface supported by a torus full of hydrogen

At least as early as 1971 Soviet scientists had suggested that rather than attempting to settle Venus's hostile surface, humans might attempt to settle the Venusian atmosphere. Geoffrey A. Landis of NASA's Glenn Research Center has summarized the perceived difficulties in colonizing Venus as being merely from the assumption that a colony would need to be based on the surface of a planet:

However, viewed in a different way, the problem with Venus is merely that the ground level is too far below the one atmosphere level. At cloud-top level, Venus is the paradise planet.

Landis has proposed aerostat habitats followed by floating cities, based on the concept that breathable air (21:79 oxygen/nitrogen mixture) is a lifting gas in the dense carbon dioxide atmosphere, with over 60% of the lifting power that helium has on Earth. In effect, a balloon full of human-breathable air would sustain itself and extra weight (such as a colony) in midair. At an altitude of 50 kilometres (31 mi) above the Venusian surface, the environment is the most Earth-like in the Solar System beyond Earth itself – a pressure of approximately 1 atm or 1000 hPa and temperatures in the 0 to 50 °C (273 to 323 K; 32 to 122 °F) range. Protection against cosmic radiation would be provided by the atmosphere above, with shielding mass equivalent to Earth's.

At the top of the clouds, the wind speed on Venus reaches up to 95 m/s (340 km/h; 210 mph), circling the planet approximately every four Earth days in a phenomenon known as "super-rotation". Compared to the Venusian solar day of 118 Earth days, colonies freely floating in this region could therefore have a much shorter day-night cycle. Allowing a colony to move freely would also reduce structural stress from the wind that they would experience if tethered to the ground.

At its most extreme, the entirety of Venus could be covered in aerostats, forming an artificial planetary surface. This would be supported by the atmosphere compressed beneath it.

Because there is not a significant pressure difference between the inside and the outside of the breathable-air balloon, any rips or tears would cause gases to diffuse at normal atmospheric mixing rates rather than an explosive decompression, giving time to repair such damages. In addition, humans would not require pressurized suits when outside, merely air to breathe, protection from the acidic rain and on some occasions low level protection against heat. Alternatively, two-part domes could contain a lifting gas like hydrogen or helium (extractable from the atmosphere) to allow a higher mass density. Therefore, putting on or taking off suits for working outside would be easier. Working outside the vehicle in non-pressurized suits would also be easier.

== See also ==
- Terraforming
- Terraforming of Mars
- Space sunshade
