= Energy tower (disambiguation) =

Energy tower may refer to:

- electricity power generation by downdraft created by evaporation of water sprayed at the top of a tall hollow cylinder, see Energy tower (downdraft)
- solar power plant technology using mirrors, see Solar power tower
- electricity power generation by solar-heated air in a chimney-style tower, see Solar updraft tower
- a machine for converting the kinetic energy in wind into electricity, see Wind turbine
- a machine for converting the kinetic energy in wind into mechanical energy, see Windmill

== See also ==
- Energy Tower, a skyscraper proposed for the city of Midland, Texas
