= Edgard Nazare =

French inventor

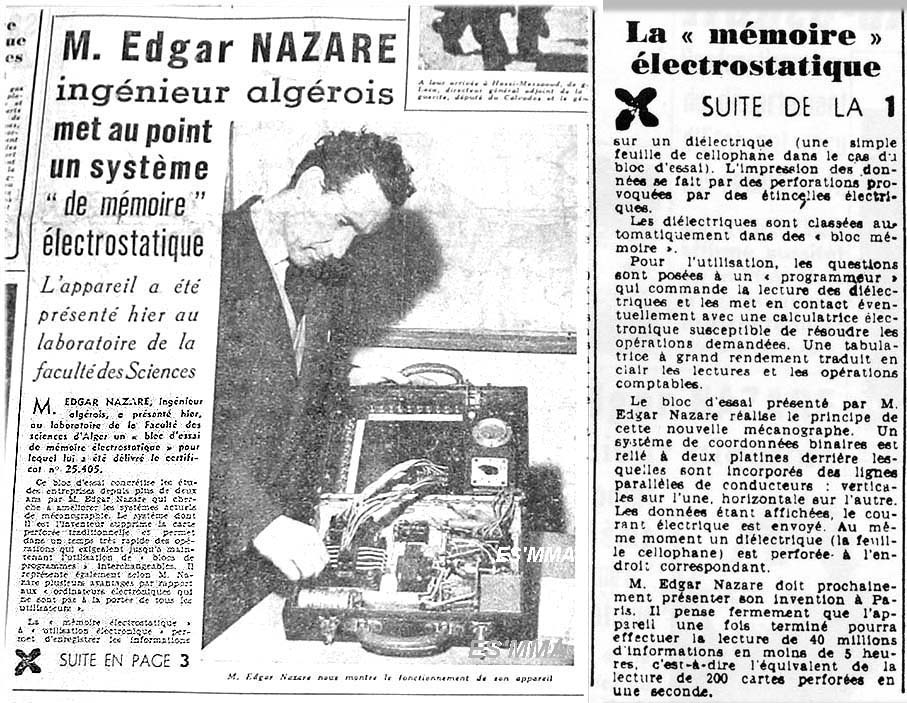
- Born: Edgard-Henri Nazare; 6 May 1914
- Died: 13 September 1998 (aged 84); Paris
- Occupation: Aerospace engineer
- Academic career
- Fields: Vortex engine, fluid mechanics, solar updraft tower, geothermal power station

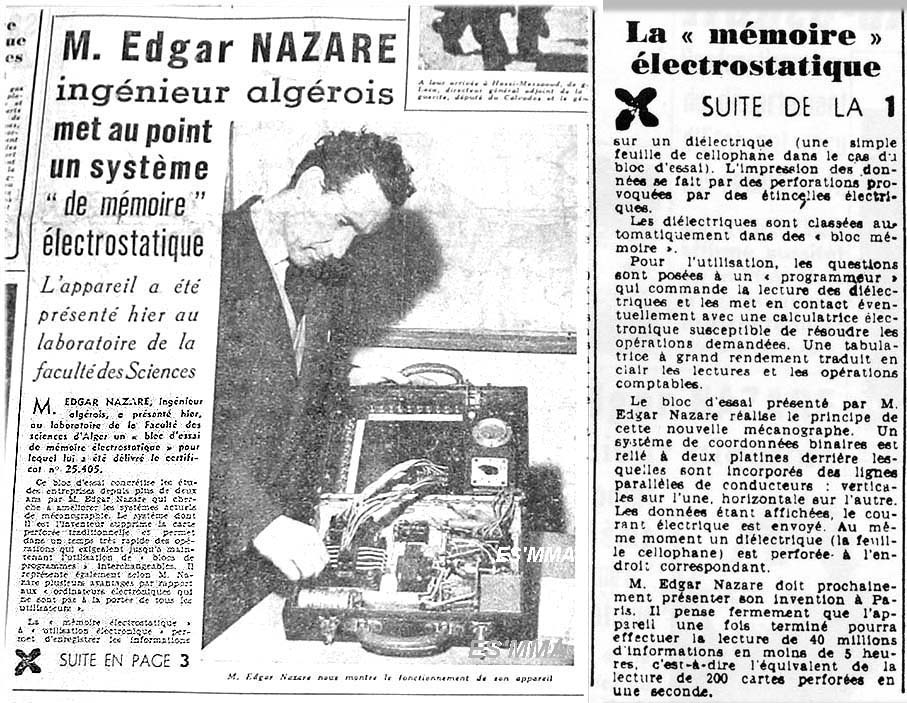
Edgard Nazare depicted in L'Écho d'Alger, 30 Jan 1958

Edgard Nazare (1914–1998) was a French aeronautical engineer and inventor.

He specialized in fluid mechanics, co-founder of the Aeronautical Research Office of Algiers, which became ONERA after the Second World War. Having worked for a long time in the Sahara, he had the opportunity to observe many whirlwinds of sand (dust devil). In 1956 he filed his first patent in Algiers on the artificial cyclone generator, this patent was re-filed later in Paris.

== Patents ==
- Artificial cyclone generator – French patent 1439849
- Tower construction for solar aero-thermal and aero-cooling stations – has metal framework mounted on central telescopic mast – French patent 8205544

== See also ==
- Solar updraft tower
