= Heinz Richter =

Heinz Richter may refer to:

- Heinz Richter (engineer) (1909–1971), engineer and author
- Heinz Richter (born 1939), German historian
- Heinz Richter (cyclist) (born 1947)
