= EVMS =

EVMS may refer to:

- Eastern Virginia Medical School, a public medical school at Old Dominion University in Norfolk, Virginia
- Enterprise Volume Management System, an integrated volume management software
- Earned value management system, implementation for determining projects' earned value

== See also ==
- EVM (disambiguation)
