= Bosch process =

Bosch process may refer to:

- Bosch deep reactive-ion etching, a microfabrication technique to form high aspect ratio features.
- Haber–Bosch process, ammonia production method in chemical industry.
- Bosch reaction, forms elemental carbon from CO_{2} and hydrogen using a metallic catalyst.
