= Artificial world =

An artificial world may refer to:

- Megastructure, large man-made structures, especially those located in outer space.
  - Artificial planet, specific type of megastructure
