= Pilot Elza or the Perfect Society =

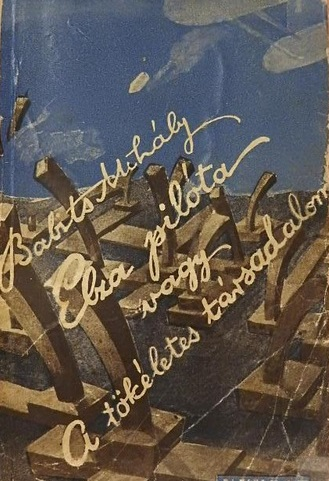
- Cover of the first edition
- Author: Mihály Babits
- Original title: Elza pilóta, vagy a tökéletes társadalom
- Working title: Fekete olvasó, A világ teremtése
- Language: Hungarian
- Genre: Science fiction, Dystopian literature
- Publication date: 1933
- Publication place: Hungary
- Media type: Novel
- ISBN: 978-9-632-76054-4

Pilot Elza or the Perfect Society (often shortened as Pilot Elza) is a dystopian novel by prominent Hungarian writer, poet, essayist, and translator Mihály Babits, published in 1933. The work—Babits' last novel—depicts a hopeless world living in constant war. The plot unfolds in an unspecified society where women too are beginning to be drafted into the military.

== Plot ==
The novel is set a hundred years after the time of Mihály Babits, during an era of perpetual war between unspecified countries. In this dystopian world, science serves only the purpose of war, while culture, religion, and family life have no place in the hollowed-out totalitarian state. The population resides in shelters due to frequent bombings and gas attacks. Because of the heavy losses among men, a law is passed so that women too can be conscripted. Elza, the daughter of a civil servant, starts serving as a pilot alongside Professor Schulberg.

== Characters ==
- Elza Kamuthy: A 19-year-old university student studying religious history, living with her parents. Despite her studies, she cannot avoid conscription and must serve as a pilot on the battlefield.
- Géza Kamuthy: Elza's father, a staunch supporter of the regime and the perpetual war.
- Mrs. Kamuthy: Elza's mother, a representative of the mindset from the pre-war era.
- Dr. Schulberg: A military doctor and professor who studies literature from the pre-war period. He views the regime with considerable cynicism, yet he holds significant influence as a powerful doctor in the home front, affecting many lives.
- Other characters: Dezső, Margit, and Captain Vermes.

== Setting ==
The societal structure depicted in the novel is contradictory: although characters talk about political parties, public assemblies, and parliamentarism, all of this is merely a formality. The decisions are made by an elusive political elite. The future state is collectivist, blending nationalism and internationalism into a rationalised system that bears both fascist and communist characteristics. The feministic aspects of the system also have a darker side: while almost exclusively women participate in higher education, this is only due to the men's service on the front lines. In earlier drafts of the story, Babits identified the unnamed city where most of the plot takes place as Szeged, Hungary.

The novel, considered a dystopian work, features a particularly science fiction element involving artificially created planets, known as "little earths." It is later revealed that the setting of Pilot Elza is one such little earth, created by a scientist from planet Earth. The artificial planet's geological processes and historical development have been accelerated, making its destruction inevitable. This is the most controversial part of Babits' novel: by setting the story on another planet, many believe that the author undermines the work’s message and vision of the future. It has been suggested that this was done to give the novel a more positive ending.

== Critical reception ==
Pilot Elza crowns earlier centuries of Hungarian speculative fiction, featuring motifs of flight, war, dystopian cities and Earth's destruction. Babits' novel shares the fate of Hungarian utopian and dystopian literature in that it did not enter the literary canon. Moreover, instead of exploring the novel's many possible interpretations, critics primarily emphasised its anti-war message and Babits' humanist outlook.

The novel can also be interpreted as an antithesis to Immanuel Kant's work Perpetual Peace, which was translated to Hungarian by Babits. Beyond the moral and philosophical reading, the novel can also be understood as a work confronting the terror of inescapable change.
