= Krzysztof Edward Haman =

Polish physicist (born 1934)

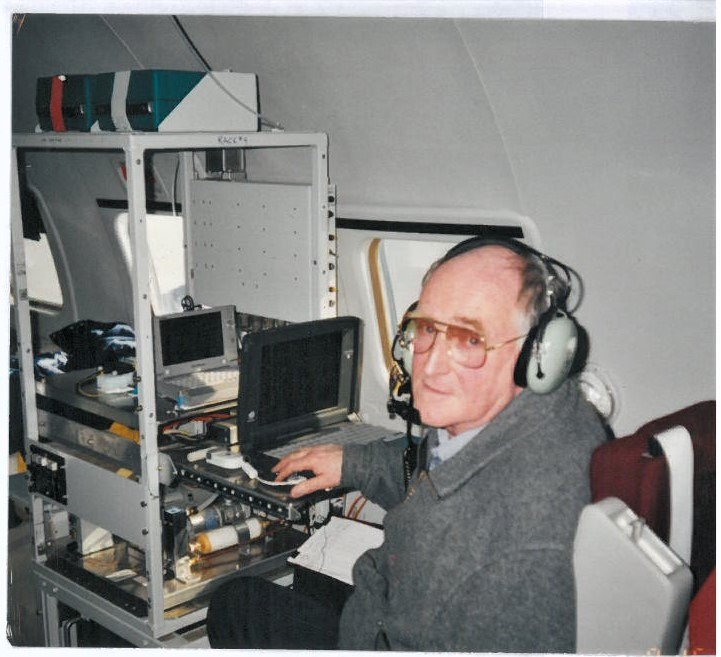
- Haman performing studies of his ultrafast thermometer
- Born: January 9, 1934 (age 92); Warsaw, Poland
- Education: University of Warsaw
- Known for: Modeling of dynamics of convective clouds, fog holography, solar updraft towers, chaos theory

Krzysztof Edward Haman (born January 9, 1934 in Warsaw) is a Polish atmospheric physicist, professor at the University of Warsaw, and member of the Polish Academy of Sciences.

== Early life and family ==
His grandfather was Edward Karol Haman (1856–1922), a property owner in Powiśle District of Warsaw. Haman's maternal family included Anna Horodyńska (1896–1983), her maternal grandmother was Olimpia Katarzyna Podleska (1865–1957). His father, Stanisław Haman (1895–1936), had an agricultural education and specialized in horse breeding, collaborating with Professor Roman Prawocheński (1877–1926), a renowned expert in this field. Stanisław was the editor of the racing news magazine "Wiadomości Wyścigowe" and the Secretary-General of the Society for the Encouragement of Horse Breeding in Poland, which purchased the land for the Tor wyścigów konnych Służewiec (Służewiec Racecourse) in Warsaw in 1925. After World War I, Professor Prawocheński sent him to Germany, where Stanisław met his future wife. Their eldest son, Janusz Haman (1923–2019), was born in Wiesbaden. The Haman family upbringing, primarily overseen by the mother, a graduate of the Sacré Coeur Sisters' Convent in Lwów (now Lviv), was strict. The family spent summers in Józefów near Otwock for the health benefits for the father and winters in Zakopane, where father Haman played naval battle games with Witold Gombrowicz at the pension of Stanisław Szober, fostering intellectual creativity. Stanisław Haman died of tuberculosis at the age of 41.

Janusz and Zdzisław, Krzysztof Haman's brothers, active scouts, joined the Gray Ranks in 1941 and later served in the Home Army, participating in the Warsaw Uprising, activities in which their mother was also involved. They earned their living working in car workshops in Warsaw. In 1937, the family first lived at 3 Maja Avenue number 16, then at Aleja Niepodległości in Warsaw. This location was near the Mokotów Airport. After the Warsaw Uprising, their home on Aleja Niepodległości was partially destroyed by fire. Krzysztof Haman then lived temporarily with his mother near Pruszków, and later in Komorów.

During Krzysztof Haman's scientific expedition to Vietnam, his first son, Andrzej, was born. Haman has five children. Maciej is a psychologist, Jacek Haman specializes in sociology, Andrzej pursued a career in biology, the youngest daughter chose library science, and Piotr ventured into the field of business. His late wife was Alina Hamanowa, who worked as an assistant professor of mathematics at the Warsaw University of Technology.

== Academic career ==
Krzysztof Haman chose an academic path in geophysics. His interest in this field began in his youth with a fascination for aviation and later meteorology, especially clouds. Health limitations prevented an aviation career, steering his focus towards geophysics. He began his studies in physics before moving to mathematics, while maintaining a close connection to geophysics. He completed his studies under the guidance of Karol Borsuk at the University of Warsaw's Faculty of Mathematics and Physics. He earned his doctorate in 1962 based on the results of atmospheric sounding measurements in Vietnam, with Teodor Kopcewicz as his supervisor. He received another degree (D.Sc.) in 1969 based on work related to the dynamics of convective clouds.

Since 1998, he has been a member of the Polish Academy of Sciences. He became an associate professor in 1977 and a full professor in 1994. He has played a significant role in the development of atmospheric physics at the University of Warsaw and in Poland. He was the director of the Institute of Geophysics, Faculty of Physics, University of Warsaw from 1976 to 1991 and the head of the Department of Atmospheric Physics at the Institute of Geophysics from 1975 to 2000. He took over the meteorology chair after Teodor Kopcewicz. Haman further developed university atmospheric physics in Poland, organizing and gathering around him students and collaborators.

His scientific work is related to tropical meteorology, cloud microphysics, dynamics of convective clouds, and physics of stratocumulus clouds. He studied the interaction between updraft and downdraft in storm cells, developed holographic techniques for laboratory cloud research. Furthermore, his research on cooling towers is being proposed in the context of solar updraft towers as a method for cloud formation in dry areas.

He is currently an emeritus professor at the University of Warsaw. He has mentored many Polish atmospheric physicists, his students include Wojciech W. Grabowski, Szymon Malinowski, Hanna Pawłowska, and Piotr Smolarkiewicz.

Scientists from other nations work with hail experiment

Haman participated in several early international field projects including the US National Hail Research Project in 1972.

=== Tropical meteorology ===
The International Geophysical Year (1957–58), considered the largest international scientific event after World War II, aimed to gather extensive observations for future synthesis of knowledge about the Earth, especially its atmosphere and climate. Krzysztof Haman participated in a "tropical" scientific expedition to Vietnam as part of this project. The research group was led by Roman Teisseyre (1929–2022), a young geophysicist at the time. The data collected during the expedition served as the basis for Haman's doctoral thesis (1962), focusing on an unusual atmospheric phenomenon he observed. He considered this work, among his numerous publications, to be his best, making a significant contribution to the field of geophysics.

=== Dynamics of convective clouds ===
He conducted research on the structure of storm cells, particularly on the interactions between updraft and downdraft currents, the study of downdraft in storm cells, the updraft drag, the formation of cumulus clouds over a localized heat source, the propagation of quasi-stationary storm cells, and the impact of convective clouds on large-scale stratification. He also focused on the exchange between filaments of saturated air with water droplets, mixed with filaments of air free from liquid water using a one-dimensional cloud model.

=== Physics of stratocumulus clouds ===
He conducted research on the turbulent mixing in stratocumulus clouds using measurements carried out near the cloud top using high-resolution instruments which allowed for the analysis of the thermodynamics and microphysics of the processes of mixing dry air with cloud air. Another article by Krzysztof Haman focuses on analyzing the transition layer between the stratocumulus cloud and the clear air above it. He states that the thickness of this layer is usually less than 20 meters (66 ft). The work also discusses the phenomenon of descending currents, which can occur in this layer under certain conditions, but usually involve only a small part of the air in the mixing process. These currents typically lose their buoyancy quickly, and only some of them may penetrate deeper into the cloud, creating so-called cloud holes.

=== Gliding ===
Krzysztof Haman was interested in understanding the physics of the interaction between mesoscale convection and individual convective clouds. He believed that this knowledge might have limited direct value for glider pilots but that a better understanding of atmospheric processes, especially at the scale of individual updrafts, could indirectly improve their qualifications. He observed that the mechanisms for enhancing local convective activity presented in his article could often occur in nature. He suggested that observations made by glider pilots, especially those equipped with GPS recorders, regarding local changes in cloud base heights and cloud tops, could be helpful in gaining a better understanding of these interactions.

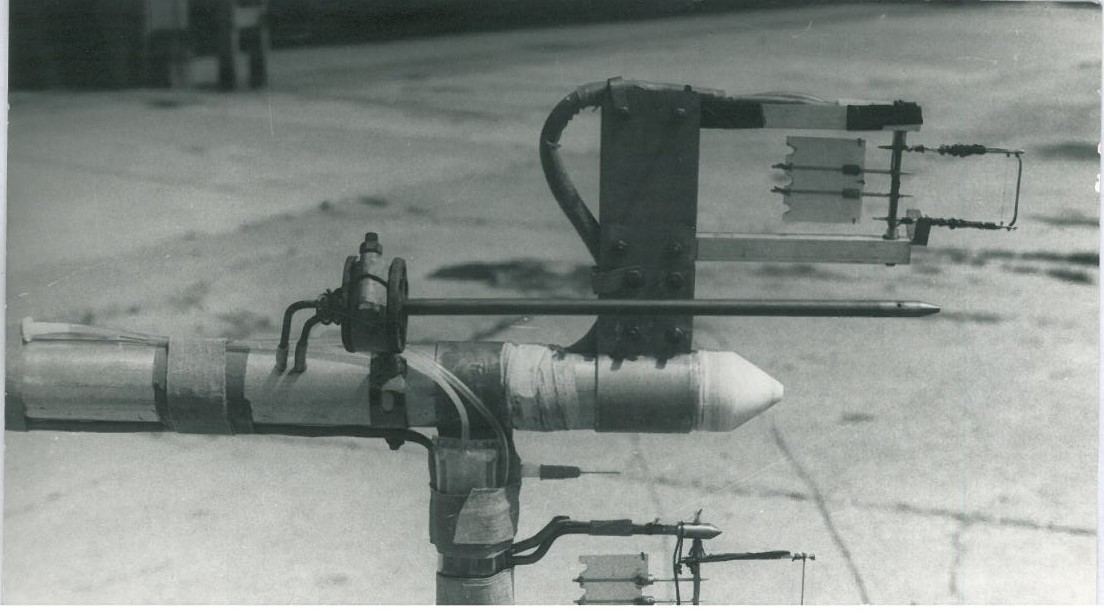
Ultrafast thermometer. Haman initiated work on this instrument in the beginning of 1990s.

=== Cooling towers ===
Krzysztof Haman worked on issues related to applied meteorology, including the assessment of the impact of cooling towers on the atmosphere. The objective of this observational program was to determine the position, vertical thickness, and horizontal width of condensation trails at various distances from power plants, as well as their temperature and humidity in comparison to the surrounding environment. These data were then compared with model predictions. Measurements were conducted using an aircraft equipped with an ATP-6 thermopsychrometer. Either a two-seat motor glider SZD-46 "Ogar" or a single-engine four-seat PZL-104 "Wilga" was used for the measurements. The measurements were recorded in analog form using onboard photo-recording oscillographs. One of the results indicated significant dynamic influences of the condensation trails on the surrounding atmosphere, manifested in temperature and humidity disturbances. The mechanism of these influences seemed to be associated either with the airflow over the trail as an obstacle or with vertical waves generated by the trail, often at a considerable altitude above it.

=== Geoengeenering ===
Some of his early ideas are discussed in the context of solar updraft tower and geoengeenering in the context of release of humid ground-level air from an atmospheric vortex or solar chimney at altitude could form clouds or precipitation, potentially altering local hydrology.

=== Fog holography ===
He conducted laboratory measurements of cloud microphysics, including attempts to estimate droplet concentrations using holographic methods. His work aimed to verify hypotheses about the random distribution of droplets in fog.

=== Science popularization ===
Krzysztof Haman has repeatedly addressed climate change issues and has been actively involved in initiatives aimed at raising public awareness in Poland in the field of atmospheric physics. Haman is also a member of the scientific council of the "Climate Science" (Nauka o Klimacie) portal, whose goal is to disseminate knowledge about climate change, particularly of anthropogenic origin.
