= Shellworld =

Family of hypothetical megastructures

A shellworld is any of several types of hypothetical megastructures:

- A planet or a planetoid turned into series of concentric matryoshka doll-like layers supported by massive pillars. A shellworld of this type features prominently in Iain M. Banks' novel Matter.
- A megastructure consisting of multiple layers of shells suspended above each other by orbital rings supported by hypothetical mass stream technology. This type of shellworld can be theoretically suspended above any type of stellar body, including planets, gas giants, stars and black holes. The most massive type of shellworld could be built around supermassive black holes at the center of galaxies.
- An inflated canopy holding high pressure air around an otherwise airless world to create a breathable atmosphere. The pressure of the contained air supports the weight of the shell. This type of structure could also be built on top of an existing smaller planet or asteroid, enabling it to support human-friendly atmosphere.
- Completely hollow shell worlds can also be created on a planetary or larger scale by contained gas alone, also called bubbleworlds, as long as the outward pressure from the contained gas balances the gravitational contraction of the entire structure, resulting in no net force on the shell. The scale is limited only by the mass of gas enclosed; the shell can be made of any mundane material. The shell can have an additional atmosphere on the outside.

== See also ==
- Artificial planet
