= Walter de Haas =

German author, translator, and editor

Walter de Haas (1886–1969), who wrote under the pseudonym Hanns Günther, was a prolific German author, translator, and editor of popular science books.

He began to publish books in 1912, including introductions to topics in electrical engineering under the Franckh'schen Verlagshandlung imprint and popular science works in the same publisher's Kosmos series. His books remain exemplary for their combination of exactness and ease of understanding.

Today, his most important book is considered to be "In a hundred years: the world's future energy supply" (In hundert Jahren - Die künftige Energieversorgung der Welt), which was published in 1931 for Franckh's "Friends of Nature Club" (Gesellschaft der Naturfreunde). In the book, he started by pointing out that humanity would one day run out of coal (he dismissed petroleum as a source of energy because he felt that it would run out very quickly) and went on to discuss other possible sources of energy that could replace coal, including geothermal power, which already existed in Italy when the book was written, and other types of renewable energy that had not yet actually been used: the solar updraft tower, wave farms, and tidal power plants.

== Bibliography ==
=== Author ===
- (undated) H.G.: Der junge Experimentier-Künstler - Physikalische Versuche, Verlag E. Rister, Nürnberg; 111 pages
- (undated) H.G.: Der junge Experimentier-Künstler - Plaudereien über Chemie, Verlag E. Rister, Nürnberg; 108 pages
- (undated) H.G.: Der junge Experimentier-Künstler - Versuche mit Elektrizität, Verlag E. Rister, Nürnberg; 108 pages
- (1911–1913) H.G.: Wie unsere Maschinen arbeiten, series in four vols.:
  - Vol. I: Elemente und Elektrochemie, Verlag der Technischen Monatshefte, Franckh’sche Verlagshandlung, Stuttgart; 88 pages
  - Vol. II: Telegraphie und Telephonie, Verlag der Technischen Monatshefte, Franckh’sche Verlagshandlung, Stuttgart; 112 pages
  - Vol. III: Dynamomaschinen und Elektromotoren, Verlag der Technischen Monatshefte, Franckh’sche Verlagshandlung, Stuttgart; 104 pages
  - Vol. IV: Elektrisches Licht u.a., Verlag der Technischen Monatshefte, Franckh’sche Verlagshandlung, Stuttgart; 128 pages
- (1917) F. A. Collins, H.G.: Flugmaschinenbuch für Jungen, Franckh’sche Verlagshandlung, Stuttgart; 240 pages
- (1917) H.G. und M. U. Schoop: Das Schoopsche Metallspritzverfahren – Seine Entwicklung und Anwendung, Franckh’sche Verlagshandlung, Stuttgart; 266 pages
- (1919) H.G.: Elektrotechnik für Alle – Eine volkstümliche Darstellung der Lehre vom elektrischen Strom und der modernen Elektrotechnik, Franckh’sche Verlagshandlung, Stuttgart; 318 pages
  - dritte Neuauflage des ehemals vierbändigen Werkes Der elektrische Strom
- (1920) H.G.: Von der Elektrizität - Einführung in die Elektrotechnik, Rascher & Cie A.-G. Verlag, Zürich; 112 pages
- (1921) H.G.: Radiotechnik – Das Reich der elektrischen Wellen, Franckh’sche Verlagshandlung, Stuttgart; 78 pages
- (1921) H.G.: Wellentelegraphie, Franckh'sche Verlagshandlung, Stuttgart, 1.-5. Auflage, Erstes bis zehntes Tausend, 112 pages
  - (1924) H.G.: Wellentelegraphie – Ein radiotechnisches Praktikum, Franckhs Technischer Verlag Dieck & Co, Stuttgart
  - ab der zwanzigsten Auflage: Das Radiobuch (Funkerbuch) – Eine Einführung in die Wellentelegraphie und -telephonie für jedermann, Franckh’s Technischer Verlag Dieck & Co, Stuttgart; 254 pages
- (1922) H.G.: Chemie für Jungen – Ein Experimentier- und Lesebuch autorisierte freie Bearbeitung nach J. H. Fabre, „Chimie de l’oncle Paul“, Rascher & Cie A.-G. Verlag, Zürich; two vols.; 264+254 pages
- (1922) H.G.: Experimentierbuch für Jungen Versuche aus der Mechanik, Versuche mit Reibungselektrizität, Zauberkünste und Taschenspielereien, Franckh’sche Verlagshandlung, Stuttgart; 220 pages
- (1922) H.G.: Technische Träume, Rascher & Cie A.-G. Verlag, Zürich; 83 pages
- (1924) H.G. und Dr. Franz Fuchs: Der praktische Radioamateur – Das ABC des Radiosports zum praktischen Gebrauch für Jedermann, Franckh’sche Verlagshandlung, Stuttgart; 419 pages
- (1924) H.G. und Hans Vatter: Bastelbuch für Radioamateure – Anleitungen zur Selbstanfertigung aller Einzelteile für Radioempfänger, Franckh’sche Verlagshandlung, Stuttgart; 224 pages
- (1924) H.G.: Schaltungsbuch für Radioamateure – Fünfzig erprobte Radioschaltungen zur Selbstfertigung von Empfängern und Verstärkern aus käuflichen Einzelteilen, Franckh’sche Verlagshandlung, Stuttgart; 150 pages
- (1925) H.G.: Der Weg des Eisens vom Erz zum Stahl - ein technisches Bilderbuch, Dieck & Co. (Franckh’s Technischer Verlag), Stuttgart; 110 pages
- (1924) H.G.: Das zweite Schaltungsbuch – Fünfzig erprobte Radioschaltungen zur Selbstfertigung von Empfängern und Verstärkern aus käuflichen Einzelteilen, Franckh’sche Verlagshandlung, Stuttgart; 166 pages
- (1926) H.G.: Pioniere der Radiotechnik - 24 Lebensbilder, Dieck & Co. (Franckh’s Technischer Verlag), Stuttgart; 80 pages
- (1926) H.G.: Radio für Anfänger – Ein Experimentier- und Bastelbuch, Franckh’sche Verlagshandlung, Stuttgart; 214 pages
- (1926) H.G.: Physik für Alle – Band 1: Das Reich der Mechanik, Dieck & Co. (Franckh’s Technischer Verlag), Stuttgart; 393 pages
- (1927) H.G.: Physik für Alle – Band 2: Schall / Wärme / Licht, Dieck & Co. (Franckh’s Technischer Verlag), Stuttgart; 327 pages
- (1927) H.G.: Starkstromversuche – Ein Experimentier- und Bastelbuch als Einführung in die Elektrotechnik, Franckh’sche Verlagshandlung, Stuttgart; 225 pages
- (1927) H.G.: Was ist Magnetismus?, Franckh’sche Verlagshandlung, Stuttgart; 78 pages
- (1927) H.G.: Das Buch von der Eisenbahn – Ihr Werden und Wesen. Der Jugend und dem Volk erzählt, Franckh’sche Verlagshandlung, Stuttgart; 274 pages
- (1927) H.G.: Aus der Technik Wunderwelt – Technische Plaudereien, Rascher & Cie A.-G. Verlag, Zürich und Leipzig; 168 pages
  - heute Reprint des GeraMond Verlag, 2006, ISBN 978-3-7654-7317-3
- (1928) H.G.: Die Eroberung der Tiefe Kosmos, Gesellschaft der Naturfreunde, Franckh’sche Verlagshandlung, Stuttgart; 79 pages
- (1929) H.G. und Paul Hirsch: Der praktische Modellflieger unter Mitarbeit von Fritz Thiele, Franckh’sche Verlagshandlung, Stuttgart
- (1929) H.G.: Gold auf der Straße - Was aus Abfallstoffen werden kann, Dieck & Co. (Franckh’s Technischer Verlag), Stuttgart; 80 pages
- (1931) H.G.: Im Reiche Röntgens – Eine Einführung in die Röntgentechnik allgemeinverständlich dargestellt, Kosmos, Gesellschaft der Naturfreunde, Franckh’sche Verlagshandlung, Stuttgart; 80 pages
- (1931) H.G.: In hundert Jahren – Die künftige Energieversorgung der Welt, Kosmos, Gesellschaft der Naturfreunde, Franckh’sche Verlagshandlung, Stuttgart; 78 pages
- (1939) H.G. und Heinz Richter: Schule des Funktechnikers – Ein Hilfsbuch für den Beruf mit besonderer Berücksichtigung der Rundfunktechnik, Franckh’sche Verlagshandlung, Stuttgart; three vols. 324+334+257 pages
- (1943) H.G. und Heinz Richter: Lexikon der Funktechnik und ihrer Grenzgebiete – unter besonderer Berücksichtigung der Rundfunktechnik, Franckh’sche Verlagshandlung, Stuttgart; 544 pages
- H.G. und R. Hell: Antenne und Erde Franckh’sche Verlagshandlung, Stuttgart
- H.G., Dr. H. Kröncke, F. Herkenrath: Tabellen und Formeln für Radioamateure, Franckh’sche Verlagshandlung, Stuttgart
- H.G. und C. Culatti: Wer gibt? – Die Funkstationen der Welt, Franckh’sche Verlagshandlung, Stuttgart
- H.G.: Fünfsprachenwörterbuch für Radioamateure, Verlag Dieck & Co, Stuttgart
- H.G.: Lexikon der gesamten Radiotechnik, Verlag Dieck & Co, Stuttgart

=== Translations, adaptations ===
- (1911/1912) Prof. Dr. K. Smalian, redigiert von H.G.: In meinen Mußestunden - Naturwissenschaftliche Anregungen und Mitteilungen für unsere Jugend III. Jahrgang, Franckh’sche Verlagshandlung, Stuttgart; 200 pages
- (1912) H.G.: Elektrotechnik für Jungen, Autorisierter deutsche Bearbeitung nach „Harper's Electricity Book for Boys“ (Joseph H. Adams, 1907), Franckh’sche Verlagshandlung, Stuttgart; Vol. 1, 216 pages
- (1914) H.G.: Frankreich bei der Arbeit – Bilder aus dem französischen Wirtschaftsleben von Victor Cambon Ingénieur des Arts et Manufactures Autorisierte deutsche Bearbeitung von Hanns Günther, Franckh’sche Verlagshandlung, Stuttgart; 104 pages
- (1915) H.G.: Durch Belgien – Wanderungen eines Ingenieurs vor dem Kriege nach J. Izart, La Belgique au travail und anderen Quellen bearbeitet von Hanns Günther, Franckh’sche Verlagshandlung, Stuttgart; 191 pages
- (1919) H.G.: Was ist Elektrizität? – Erzählungen eines Elektrons Autorisierte freie Bearbeitung nach Ch. R. Gibson „Autobiography of an electron“, Franckh’sche Verlagshandlung, Stuttgart; 101 pages
- (1919) H.G.: Kleine Elektrotechnik für Jungen – Eine Anleitung zum Bau elektr. Apparate u. Instrumente sowie zum Verständnis ihrer Wirkungsweise unter Benutzung von Joseph H. Adams „Harpers Electricity for Boys“, Franckh’sche Verlagshandlung, Stuttgart; 240 pages
  - das Buch wurde nach vielen Auflagen ab 1952 fortgeführt von Heinz Richter unter dem Titel Elektrotechnik für Jungen, Franckh’sche Verlagshandlung, Stuttgart.
- (1920) H.G.: Elektrotechnisches Bastelbuch (Große Elektrotechnik für Jungen) unter autorisierter Benützung von „Harpers Electricity for Boys“, Franckh’sche Verlagshandlung, Stuttgart; two vols. 227+258 pages;
- (1922) H.G.: Die Installation elektrischer Klingelanlagen – für Elektroinstallateure und zum Selbstgebrauch nach einem Manuskript von Eugen Hager, Mechaniker, Romanshorn frei bearbeitet von Hanns Günther, Franckhs Technischer Verlag Dieck & Co, Stuttgart; 56 pages
- (1928) H.G.: Ins Innere des Atoms autorisierte deutsche Bearbeitung nach John Mills, „Within the Atom“, Verlag von Philipp Reclam jun., Leipzig; 206 pages

=== Works in which he served as editor ===
- (1915) Jahrbuch der Technik (Sonderausgabe von „Technik für Alle“) – 1. Jahrgang, Franckh’sche Verlagshandlung, Stuttgart; 392 pages
- (1916) Jahrbuch der Technik (Sonderausgabe von „Technik für Alle“) – 2. Jahrgang, Franckh’sche Verlagshandlung, Stuttgart; 376 pages
- (1917) Jahrbuch der Technik (Sonderausgabe von „Technik für Alle“) – 3. Jahrgang, Franckh’sche Verlagshandlung, Stuttgart; 382 pages
- (1918) Ferienbuch für Jungen in two vols., unter Mitarbeit von Herm. Emch, Prof. Dr. August Forel, Dr. H. Freidrich, Hch. Meyer, N. Noll-Tauber, Dr. Max Oettli, Prof. Dr. P. Steinmann; Franckh’sche Verlagshandlung, Stuttgart; 160+152 pages
- (1921) Wunder in uns – Ein Buch vom menschlichen Körper für jedermann, unter Mitarbeit von Dr. Herm. Dekker, Dr. Fritz Kahn, Dr. Ad. Koelsch, Prof. Dr. C. L. Schleich; Rascher & Cie A.-G. Verlag, Zürich; 381 pages
- (1923) Taten der Technik – Ein Buch unserer Zeit vol. 1, in Verbindung mit Artur Fürst, Dipl.-Ing. E. Lasswitz, Dr. L. Richtera, Dipl.-Ing. N. Stern, Dr.-Ing. P. Schuster; Rascher & Cie A.-G. Verlag, Zürich; 323 pages
- (1924) Was fang' ich an? - Ein Beschäftigungsbuch, unter Mitarbeit von Prof. Dr. W. Brunner, Dr. O. Kuhfahl, Dr. F. Stäger und Hans Vatter; Rascher & Cie A.-G. Verlag, Zürich; 259 pages
- (1924) Die Weite Welt – Ein Buch der Reisen und Abenteuer, Erfindungen und Entdeckungen unter Mitarbeit von Leonhard Adelt, W.W. Bechtle, Prof. Dr. W. Brunner, Dr. Friedo Devens, Heinrich Göhring, Dr. H. Hauri, Dr. Adolf Koelsch, Dipl.-Ing. E. Lasswitz, H. Meyer, Carl W. Neumann, Dr. Colin Ross, F. Saxer, Dr.-Ing. P. Schuster, Dr. W. Schweisheimer, Hans Vatter und Geheimrat Wernekke; Rascher & Cie A.-G. Verlag, Zürich
- (1925) : Wie erwerbe ich eine Versuchserlaubnis – Ein Hand- u. Hilfsbuch für Radioamateure, unter Mitarbeit von Friedrich Dencker; Franz Fuchs; P. Lertes [u. a.], Franckh’sche Verlagshandlung, Stuttgart; 1925
- (1935) (Co-edited) Handbuch der Funk-Technik, Hanns Günther, M.v.Ardenne u.A., Franckh'sche Verlagshandlung Stuttgart 1935, vol. 1, 226+10 pages
- (1937) (Co-edited) Handbuch der Funk-Technik, Hanns Günther, M.v.Ardenne u.A., Franckh'sche Verlagshandlung Stuttgart 1937, vol. 2, 217+12 pages
