= EVM =

EVM may refer to:

- Earned value management in project management
- Eduardo V. Manalo, a Filipino Christian church leader
  - EVM Convention Center, a convention center named after him
- Electronic voting machine
- EnviroMission, an Australian energy company
- Error vector magnitude, measure of radio transmission/reception
- Estonian Open Air Museum (Estonian: Eesti Vabaõhumuuseum)
- Ethereum Virtual Machine, a blockchain computer architecture
- Ethnoveterinary medicine
- Environmental science, academic field
- Eye, Verbal, and Motor, the three components of the Glasgow Coma Scale.
