= Bosch reaction =

Process that is used to industrially create hydrogen

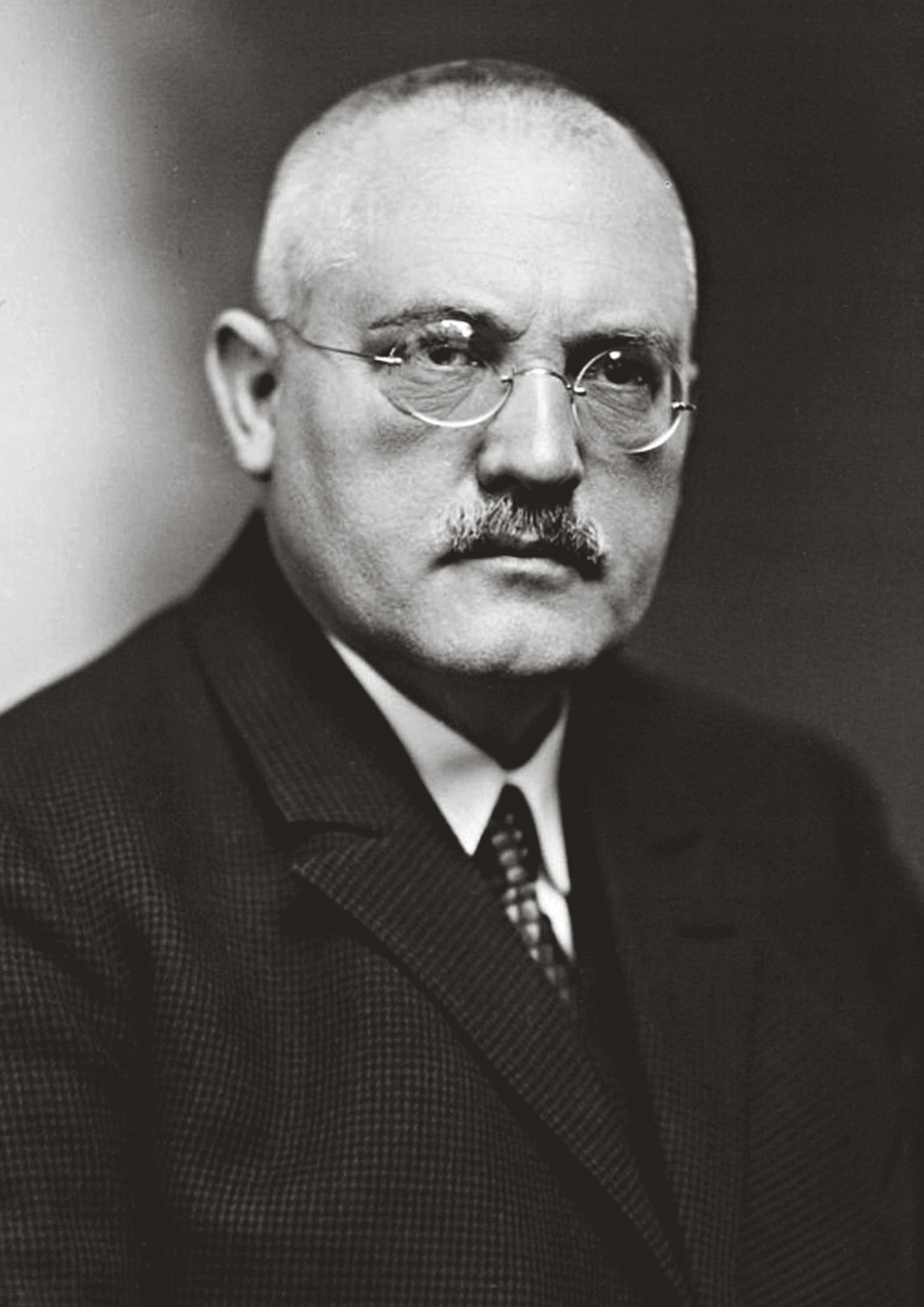
Carl Bosch in 1908

The Bosch reaction is a catalytic chemical reaction between carbon dioxide (CO_{2}) and hydrogen (H_{2}) that produces elemental carbon (C,graphite), water, and a 10% return of invested heat. CO_{2} is usually reduced by H_{2} to carbon in presence of a catalyst (e.g. iron (Fe)) and requires a temperature level of 530–730 °C (986–1,346 °F).

The overall reaction is as follows:

CO_{2}(g) + 2 H_{2}(g) → C(s) + 2 H_{2}O(l)

The above reaction is actually the result of two reactions. The first reaction, the reverse water gas shift reaction, is a fast one:

CO_{2} + H_{2} → CO + H_{2}O

The second reaction is the rate determining step:

CO + H_{2} → C + H_{2}O

The overall reaction produces 2.3×10^{3} joules for every gram of carbon dioxide reacted at 650 °C. Reaction temperatures are in the range of 450 to 600 °C.

The reaction can be accelerated in the presence of an iron, cobalt or nickel catalyst. Ruthenium also serves to speed up the reaction.

== Applications ==
Together with the Sabatier reaction, the Bosch reaction is studied as a way to remove carbon dioxide and to generate clean water aboard a space station.

The reaction is also used to produce graphite for radiocarbon dating with Accelerator Mass Spectrometry.

The Bosch reaction is being investigated for use in maintaining space station life support. Though the Bosch reaction would present a completely closed hydrogen and oxygen cycle which only produces atomic carbon as waste, difficulties in maintaining its higher required temperature and properly handling carbon deposits mean that significantly more research will be required before a Bosch reactor can become a reality. One problem is that the production of elemental carbon tends to foul the catalyst's surface, which is detrimental to the reaction's efficiency.

According to writer Paul Birch, the Bosch reaction could be utilised to terraform the planet Venus by reducing the amount of carbon dioxide in its atmosphere.
