= Heinz Richter (engineer) =

Heinz Richter (1 November 1909 – 14 May 1971) was a German radio engineer and one of the most successful authors of introductory-level radio and electronics textbooks in Germany from the 1950s throughout the 1970s.

== Biography ==
Born in Gehrden, Germany, Richter was influenced early by the books of Walther de Haas ("Hanns Günther"). He enrolled in the Höhere Technische Lehranstalt in Munich, from which he graduated as Engineer in 1932.

Already in 1934, in cooperation with Günther, Richter published his first textbook for radio engineers, Schule des Funktechnikers, which immediately became popular. This was soon followed by a revised edition of Günther's classic, Elektrotechnik für Jungen (Electronics for Boys).

In the 1930s and 1940s, Richter worked as a development engineer and engineering group leader at the radio research group of the Aeronautical Research Institute in Oberpfaffenhofen (Forschungsinstitut für Flugfunk) under Prof. Max Dieckmann (today, the RF and Radar laboratory of DLR, the German Aerospace Center).

After 1945, Richter pursued a career as an independent author and engineering consultant. He held 10 patents and wrote over 1,000 articles for trade publications.

In the late 1950s, Richter designed the "Kosmos" radio and electronics experimental kits sold by publisher Franckh-Kosmos.

== Works ==
Richter was a prolific writer, whose books enjoyed long-term popularity. Revised editions of some (e.g. Elektrotechnik für Jungen) were published until the 1980s. He has however been criticized for superficiality – while some books contain detailed building instructions along with pictures of sample kits, others (e.g. Schaltungsbuch der Transistortechnik) are little more than commented collections of industry application circuits.

- Schule des Funktechnikers, Hanns Günther & Heinz Richter
- Elektrotechnik für Jungen, Heinz Richter (based on Hanns Günther), 1948 (revised editions until 1982)
- Radiotechnik für Alle, 1949
  - Vol. I, Radiotechnik für Alle
  - Vol. II, UKW-FM
  - Vol. III, Fernsehen für Alle, 1951
  - Vol. IV, Der Kurzwellen-Amateur (Karl Schultheiß)
- Radiopraxis für Alle
  - Vol. I, Der Bau von Normal- und UKW-Empfängern
  - Vol. II, Fernseh-Experimentier-Praxis
  - Vol. III, Der Ultrakurzwellen-Amateur (Karl Schultheiß)
  - Vol. IV, Tonaufnahme für Alle, 1953
  - Vol. V, Elektro-Akustik für Alle, 1954
- Praxis der Elektronik
  - Vol. I, Elektronik in Selbstbau und Versuch
  - Vol. II, Praktische Elektronik für jeden Beruf
  - Vol. III, Transistorpraxis
- Radiobasteln für Jungen, 1958
- Neue Schule der Radiotechnik und Elektronik
  - Vol. I, Allgemeine Grundlagen, Bauelemente, 1958
  - Vol. II, Grundschaltungen der Radiotechnik und Elektronik, 1959
  - Vol. III, Geräte, Anlagen, Verfahrenstechnik der Radiotechnik und Elektronik, 1959
  - Vol. IV, Meßgeräte und Meßverfahren, 1959
- Meßpraxis, 1961
- Schaltungsbuch der Transistortechnik
- Bastelbuch der Mini-Elektronik, 1969
