= Energy tower (downdraft) =

Device for producing electrical power

Sharav Sluice Energy Tower

The energy tower is a device for producing electrical power. The brainchild of Dr. Phillip Carlson, expanded by Professor Dan Zaslavsky from the Technion. Energy towers spray water on hot air at the top of the tower, making the cooled air fall through the tower and drive a turbine at the tower's bottom.

== Concept ==
An energy tower (also known as a downdraft energy tower, because the air flows down the tower) is a tall (1,000 meters) and wide (400 meters) hollow cylinder with a water spray system at the top. Pumps lift the water to the top of the tower and then spray the water inside the tower. Evaporation of water cools the hot, dry air hovering at the top. The cooled air, now denser than the outside warmer air, falls through the cylinder, spinning a turbine at the bottom. The turbine drives a generator which produces the electricity.

The greater the temperature difference between the air and water, the greater the energy efficiency. Therefore, downdraft energy towers should work best in a hot dry climate. Energy towers require large quantities of water. Salt water is acceptable, although care must be taken to prevent corrosion; desalination can help solve this problem.

The energy that is extracted from the air is ultimately derived from the sun, so this can be considered a form of solar power. Energy production continues at night, because air retains some of the day's heat after dark. However, power generation by the energy tower is affected by the weather: it slows down each time the ambient humidity increases (such as during a rainstorm), or the temperature falls.

A related approach is the solar updraft tower, which heats air in glass enclosures at ground level and sends the heated air up a tower driving turbines at the base. Updraft towers do not pump water, which increases their efficiency, but do require large amounts of land for the collectors. Land acquisition and collector construction costs for updraft towers must be compared to pumping infrastructure costs for downdraft collectors. Operationally, maintaining the collector structures for updraft towers must be compared to pumping costs and pump infrastructure maintenance.

== Cost/efficiency ==
Zaslavsky and other authors estimate that depending on the site and financing costs, energy could be produced in the range of 1-4 cents per kWh, well below alternative energy sources other than hydro. Pumping the water requires about 50% of the turbine's output. Zaslavsky claims that the Energy Tower would achieve up to 70-80% of the Carnot limit. If the conversion efficiency turns out to be much lower, it is expected to have an adverse impact on projections made for cost of energy.

Projections made by Altmann and by Czisch about conversion efficiency and about cost of energy (cents/kWh) are based only on model calculations, no data on a working pilot plant have ever been collected.

Actual measurements on the 50 kW Manzanares pilot solar updraft tower found a conversion efficiency of 0.53%, although SBP believe that this could be increased to 1.3% in a large and improved 100 MW unit. This amounts to about 10% of the theoretical limit for the Carnot cycle. There is a significant difference between the up-draft and down-draft proposals. The usage of water as a working-medium dramatically increases the potential for thermal energy capture, and electrical generation, due to its specific heat capacity. While the design may have its problems (see next section) and the stated efficiency claims has yet to be demonstrated, it would be an error to extrapolate performance from one to the other simply because of similarities in the name.

== Potential problems ==
- In salty humid air corrosion rates can be very high. This concerns the tower and the turbines.
- The technology requires a hot and arid climate. Such locations include the coast of West Africa, Western Australia, northern Chile, Namibia, the Red Sea, Persian Gulf, and the Gulf of California. Most of these regions are remote and thinly populated, and would require power to be transported over long distances to where it is needed. Alternatively, such plants could provide captive power for nearby industrial uses such as desalination plants, aluminium production via the Hall-Héroult process, or to generate hydrogen for ammonia production.
- Humidity as a result of plant operation may be an issue for nearby communities. A 400-meter diameter powerplant producing wind velocity of 22 meters per second, must add about 15 grams of water per kilogram of air processed. This is equal to 41 tonnes of water per second (m^{3}s^{−1}). In terms of humid air, this is 10 cubic kilometers of very humid air each hour. Thus, a community even 100 kilometers away may be unpleasantly affected.
- Brine is a problem in proportion to the humidity created, since water's vapor pressure decreases with salinity, it is reasonable to expect at least as much brine as water in humidity. This means that a river of brine flows away from the powerplant at 41 tonnes per second (m^{3}s^{−1}), along with a river of saline water flowing in with 82 tonnes of water per second (m^{3}s^{−1}).

Large industrial consumers often locate near cheap sources of electricity. However, many of these desert regions also lack necessary infrastructure, increasing capital requirements and overall risk.

== Demonstration project ==
Maryland-based Solar Wind Energy, Inc. was developing a 685-metre (2,247 ft) tower. Under the most recent design specifications, the Tower designed for a site near San Luis, Arizona, has a gross production capacity of up to 1,250 megawatts. Due to lower capacities during winter days, the output for sale to the grid averaged over the entire year is approximately 435 megawatts.

== See also ==
- Psychrometrics (not to be confused with Psychometrics)
- Solar updraft tower
