= EnviroMission =

Australian company

- Traded as: EVM
- Industry: Renewable energy
- Founded: 2 November 2000; 26 years ago
- Headquarters: City of South Melbourne, Australia
- Services: Proposing solar updraft towers
- Website: www.enviromission.com.au

EnviroMission (ASX: EVM) is an Australian company founded on 2 November 2000 as an Australian public company. It has, since 2001, proposed to build a solar updraft tower power generating station known as Solar Tower Buronga in western New South Wales at a site 25 km northeast of Mildura. As of 12 February 2007, EnviroMission claimed to be conducting feasibility studies to build a tower or towers in Texas. None of these projects have progressed beyond the planning stage.

In 2008 the company merged with US-based SolarMission Technologies, Inc.

EnviroMission has begun moving forward to build two 200 MW solar updraft towers in Arizona. In October 2010, they received approval from the Southern California Public Power Authority to sell electricity generated from the facilities. EnviroMission lost a deal with the Southern California Public Power Authority after EnviroMission was unable to guarantee a completion date of their solar tower. As of 2014, construction had not begun.

The company was delisted from the Australian Securities Exchange in April 2019.
