= Energy Tower (Midland, Texas) =

Energy Tower at City Center
- Interactive map of the Energy Tower at City Center area

Record height
- Preceded by: Bank of America Building
- Surpassed by: Present

General information
- Status: Never built
- Location: 303 W. Wall St. Midland
- Coordinates: 31.998061°N 102.076254°W
- Construction started: 2013
- Completed: 2015 (planned)
- Opening: 2015
- Cost: Approx. $300-$350 Million
- Owner: Energy Related Properties

Height
- Roof: 870 ft (270 m)

Technical details
- Floor count: 59 (1 underground retail and 5 basement floors)
- Floor area: 990,275.79 sq ft (91,999.631 m^{2})
- Lifts/elevators: 27

Design and construction
- Architect: Michael Edmonds of Edmonds International
- Developer: Energy Related Properties

Other information
- Parking: Underground parking

Energy Tower at City Center was a skyscraper proposed for the city of Midland, Texas. The old Midland County courthouse was demolished to make way for the skyscraper.

== History ==
Energy Tower was planned to stand at 870 feet tall with 59 floors (6 floors below ground). Had it been built, the building would have been the sixth-tallest building in Texas.

The developers canceled the pending purchase agreement for the old Midland County Courthouse property, where they planned to build the project on September 10, 2014.
