= Venusian =

Venusian /vɪˈnjuːʃən/, Venerean /vɪˈnɪəriən/, or Venereal may refer to:

- Venus, a planet
  - Venusians, hypothetical or fictional beings that inhabit the planet Venus
- Venus (goddess)

== See also ==
- Cytherean, for a discussion of adjectives relating to the planet Venus
- Venus (disambiguation)
