= Paul Birch (writer) =

British author, engineer, and scientist (1956–2012)

Paul Birch (25 May 1956 – 4 July 2012) was a British author, engineer and scientist, who worked in radioastronomy and satellite communications, and latterly wrote full-time.

He was educated at Merchant Taylors' School, Crosby and Trinity College, Cambridge and worked for Marconi Defence Systems and Plessey Radar.

He was a former Fellow of the British Interplanetary Society.

He also notably worked on orbital rings and supramundane planets.

He stood for the United Kingdom Independence Party (UKIP) in an election taking 11.3% of the vote. He was a Town Councillor in Cowes, Isle of Wight at the time of his death.

In 1982, Birch published a series of papers in the Journal of the British Interplanetary Society which described orbital rings and described a form which he called Partial Orbital Ring System (PORS).
