= Artificial planet =

Proposed stellar megastructure

An artificial planet (also planetary replica and replica planet) is a proposed circumstellar megastructure with sufficient mass to generate its own gravity field strong enough to prevent atmosphere from escaping, though the term has sometimes been used to describe other types of megastructures with self-sufficient ecosystems. The concept of an artificial planet appears in many works of science fiction.

== Science ==
=== Artificial planet ===
Mark Hempsell suggests that an artificial planet could be created in the Solar System in preparation for future space colonization, most likely in the habitable zone between the orbits of Venus and Mars. It could evolve from a smaller artificial space habitat. Its purpose would be similar to that of other megastructures intended as living spaces (such as the O'Neill cylinder) or to that of colonizing (or terraforming) existing planets. Unlike a space habitat, an artificial planet would be large enough to create its own gravity field, which would prevent its atmosphere from escaping; the atmosphere would help protect the planet from radiation and meteorites. However, an artificial planet would have a much worse ratio of mass to usable surface area.

Material for artificial-planet construction could be extracted from stars or gas giants or from asteroids. A sufficiently advanced civilization could use those resources to mass-produce artificial planets, using a circumstellar factory that itself would likely be the size of a large planet.

Construction of an artificial planet is theoretically possible but would likely take thousands of years and would be extremely costly. It has also been suggested that such an endeavor would be more challenging than terraforming existing planets, though both ideas are speculative at this point.

=== Other concepts ===
The term "artificial planet" has also been used to describe other types of megastructures, such as large spherical space stations. D. R. Glover defines an "artificial planet" as "a self-sufficient, independent ecosystem in space", noting that such an entity's size is immaterial and that it could be much smaller than what is traditionally described as a planet. Glover sees such a station as a step toward the development of ships capable of interstellar travel.

Paul Birch uses the term "artificial planet" in the sense of a supramundane planet (this term derives from the Latin words supra, meaning "above", and mundus, meaning "world"). Such a structure would resemble a Dyson sphere but with the habitable surface on the outer surface (as opposed to the inner surface), and it would be built around a massive body such as a giant planet or a black hole. It would be supported on multiple orbital rings.

== Fiction and popular culture ==
The concept of an "artificial planet" appears in many works of science fiction. An artificial planet is the main setting of science-fiction series such as Philip José Farmer's Riverworld series (1971–1983), Jack L. Chalker's Well World series (1977-2000), and Paul J. McAuley's Confluence trilogy (1997-1999). Iain Banks' novel Matter (2008) is set on a shellworld (an artificial planet with several habitable layers).

The concept of artificial planets also appears in The Hitchhiker’s Guide to the Galaxy franchise created by Douglas Adams, in which one of the characters is a "planet designer". The Death Star in the Star Wars franchise, as well, has been called an artificial planet.

== Potential risks ==
The risks of failure are significant, with potential unintended consequences that could arise from creating artificial planets, including ecological disasters or the failure of life-support systems.

== See also ==
- The Brick Moon
- Dyson sphere
- Ecumenopolis
- Generation ship
- Ringworld
- Shellworld
