= Solar updraft tower =

Thermal convection power plant

Schematic presentation of a solar updraft tower

The solar updraft tower (SUT) is a design concept for a renewable-energy power plant for generating electricity from low-temperature solar heat. Sunshine heats the air beneath a very wide greenhouse-like roofed collector structure surrounding the central base of a very tall chimney tower. The resulting convection causes a hot air updraft in the tower by the chimney effect. This airflow drives wind turbines, placed in the chimney updraft or around the chimney base, to produce electricity.

As of mid 2018, although several prototype models have been built, no full-scale practical units are in operation. Scaled-up versions of demonstration models are planned to generate significant power. They may also allow development of other applications, such as to agriculture or horticulture, to water extraction or distillation, or to remediate urban air pollution.

Commercial investment may have been discouraged by the high initial cost of building a very large novel structure, the large land area required, and the risk of investment. A few prototypes have been built in Spain in 1981, in Iran in 2011, and in China in 2010 (see below), and projects were proposed for parts of Africa, the US and Australia.

In 2014, National Geographic published a popular update, including an interview with an informed engineering proponent. A solar updraft tower power plant can generate electricity from the low temperature atmospheric heat gradient between ground or surface level and structurally reachable altitude. Functional or mechanical feasibility is now less of an issue than capitalisation. A comprehensive review of theoretical and experimental aspects of solar updraft tower power plant (SUTPP) development is available, recommending commercial development. A review of progress in demonstration and modelled data was presented in 2020 by Dogan Eyrener, and included in publication of proceedings. A review of combined technologies to address intermittency of power output, of hybrid solar updraft tower with complementary technologies was published in 2022. Combined, multiple or hybrid technologies include combined updraft-downdraft towers, and solar updraft-gas turbine waste heat transfer.

== Design ==
Power output depends primarily on two factors: collector area and chimney height. A larger area collects and warms a greater volume of air to flow up the chimney; collector areas as large as 7 kilometres (4.3 mi) in diameter have been discussed. A larger chimney height increases the pressure difference via the stack effect; chimneys as tall as 1,000 metres (3,281 ft) have been discussed.

Heat is stored inside the collector area allowing SUTs to operate 24 hours a day. The ground beneath the solar collector, water in bags or tubes, or a saltwater thermal sink in the collector could add thermal capacity and inertia to the collector. Humidity of the updraft and release of the latent heat of condensation in the chimney could increase the energy flux of the system.

Turbines with a horizontal axis can be installed in a ring around the base of the tower, as once planned for an Australian project and seen in the diagram above; or—as in the prototype in Spain—a single vertical axis turbine can be installed inside the chimney.

A nearly negligible amount of carbon dioxide is produced as part of operations, while construction material manufacturing can create emissions. Net energy payback is estimated to be 2–3 years.

As of 2019, the efficiency of SUTs, which primarily depends on chimney height, was less than 2%. Since solar collectors occupy significant amounts of land, deserts and other low-value sites are most likely. Improvements in the solar heat collection efficiency by using unglazed transpired collector can significantly reduce the land required for the solar array.

A small-scale solar updraft tower may be an attractive option for remote regions in developing countries. The relatively low-tech approach could allow local resources and labour to be used for construction and maintenance.

Locating a tower at high latitudes could produce up to 85 percent of the output of a similar plant located closer to the equator, if the collection area is sloped significantly toward the equator. The sloped collector field, which also functions as a chimney, is built on suitable mountainsides, with a short vertical chimney on the mountaintop to accommodate the vertical axis air turbine. The results showed that solar chimney power plants at high latitudes may have satisfactory thermal performance.

== History and progress ==
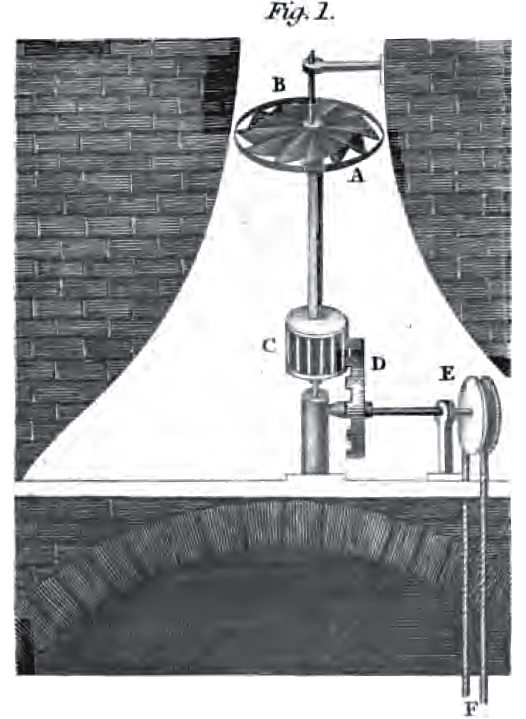
Smoke-jack from A Treatise of Mechanics (1826)

A chimney turbine was envisioned as a smoke jack, and illustrated 500 years ago by Leonardo da Vinci. An animal spitted above a fire or in an oven could be turned by a vertical axis turbine with four angled vanes in the chimney updraft.

Alfred Rosling Bennett published the first patent describing a "Convection Mill" in 1896. Even if in the title of the patent and in the claims the word "Toy" clearly appears and even if in the overall description made inside the patent it is evident that the idea was to produce small devices, in page 3 at lines 49–54 Bennett envisions much larger devices for bigger scale applications. A model of this "convection mill", built in 1919 by Albert H. Holmes & Son (London) to demonstrate the phenomenon of convection currents, is on display in the Science Museum, London.

In 1903, Isidoro Cabanyes, a colonel in the Spanish army, proposed a solar chimney power plant in the magazine La energía eléctrica. Another early description was published in 1931 by German author Hanns Günther. Beginning in 1975, Robert E. Lucier applied for patents on a solar chimney electric power generator; between 1978 and 1981 patents (since expired) were granted in Australia, Canada, Israel, and the US.

In 1926 Prof Engineer Bernard Dubos proposed to the French Academy of Sciences the construction of a Solar Aero-Electric Power Plant in North Africa with its solar chimney on the slope of a large mountain. A mountainside updraft tower can also function as a vertical greenhouse.

In 1956, Edgard Nazare, after observing several dust devils in the southern Sahara, filed his first patent in Algiers on the artificial cyclone generator. This patent was re-filed later in Paris

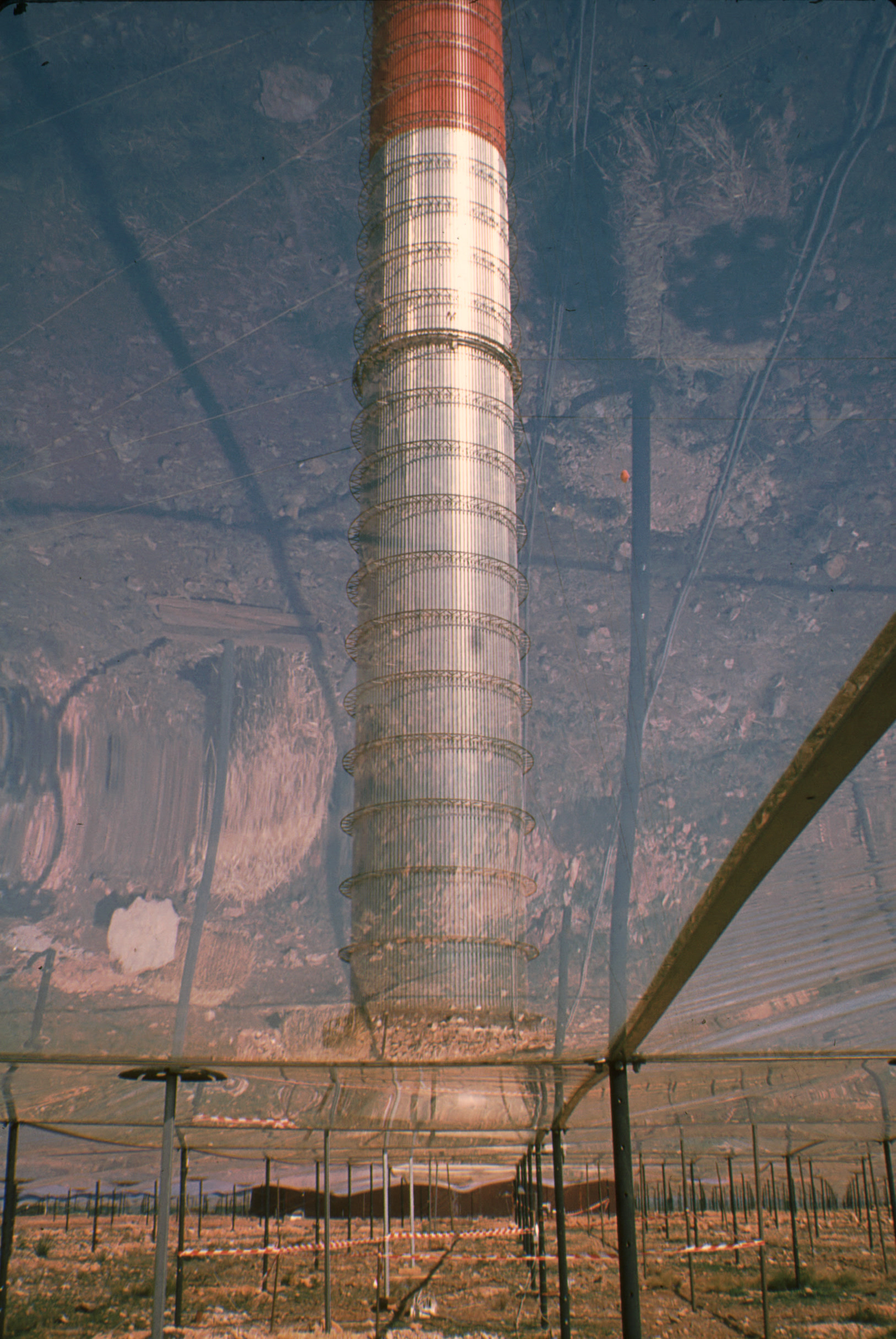
Manzanares Solar Chimney viewed through the polyester collector roof

In 1982, a small-scale experimental model of a solar draft tower was built in Manzanares, Ciudad Real, 150 km south of Madrid, Spain at 39°02′34.45″N 3°15′12.21″W. The power plant operated for approximately eight years. The tower's guy-wires were not protected against corrosion and failed due to rust and storm winds. The tower blew over and was decommissioned in 1989.

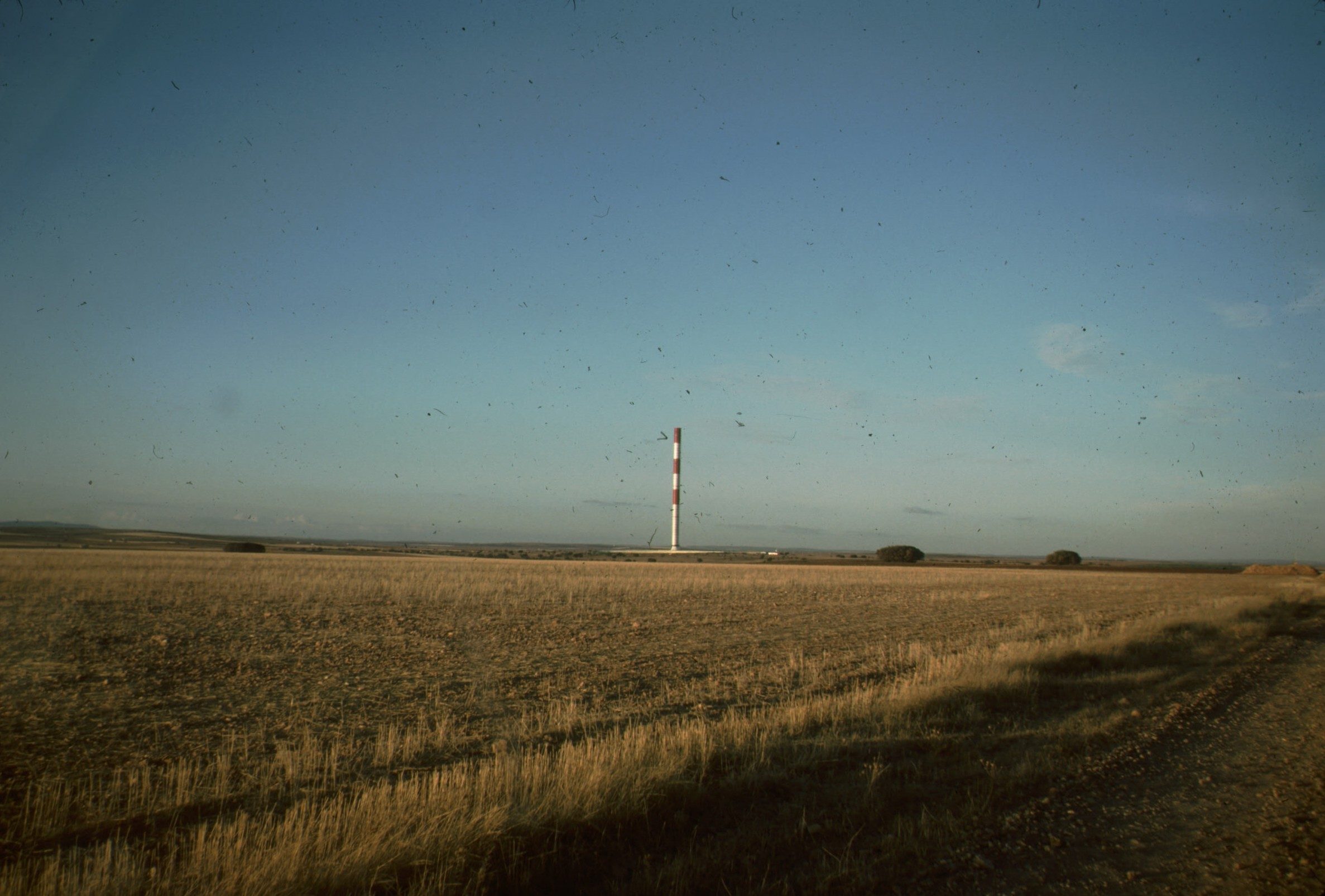
SUT as seen from La Solana

Inexpensive materials were used in order to evaluate their performance. The solar tower was built of iron plating only 1.25 millimetres (0.049 in) thick under the direction of a German engineer, Jörg Schlaich. The project was funded by the German government.

The chimney had a height of 195 metres (640 ft) and a diameter of 10 metres (33 ft) with a collection area (greenhouse) of 4.6 hectares (11 acres) and a diameter of 244 metres (801 ft), obtaining a maximum power output of about 50 kW. Various materials were used for testing, such as single or double glazing or plastic (which turned out not to be durable enough). One section was used as an actual greenhouse. During its operation, 180 sensors measured inside and outside temperature, collecting humidity and wind speed data on a second-by-second basis. This experimental setup did not sell energy.

In December 2010, a tower in Jinshawan in Inner Mongolia, China started operation, producing 200 kilowatts. The 1.38 billion RMB (USD 208 million) project was started in May 2009. It was intended to cover 277 hectares (680 acres) and produce 27.5 MW by 2013, but had to be scaled back. The solar chimney plant was expected to improve the climate by covering loose sand, restraining sandstorms. Critics have said that the 50m tall tower is too short to work properly and that it was a mistake to use glass in metal frames for the collector, as many of them cracked and shattered in the heat.

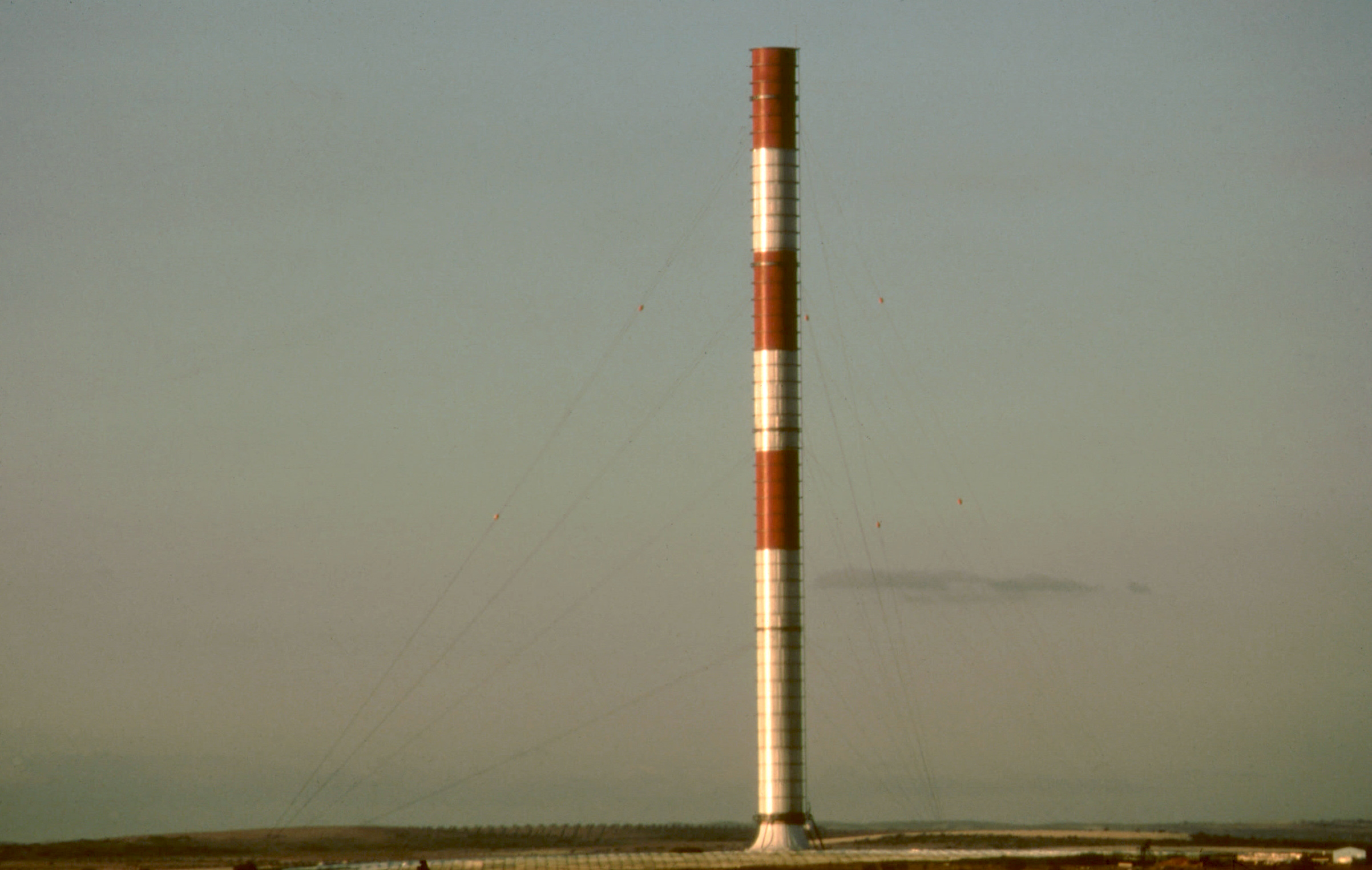
SUT powerplant prototype in Manzanares, Spain, seen from a point 8 km to the South

A proposal to construct a solar updraft tower in Fuente el Fresno, Ciudad Real, Spain, entitled Ciudad Real Torre Solar would be the first of its kind in the European Union and would stand 750 metres (2,460 ft) tall, covering an area of 350 hectares (860 acres). It is expected to produce 40 MW. At that height, it would be nearly twice as tall as the Belmont TV Mast, which was once the tallest structure in the European Union, before being shortened by 24 metres.

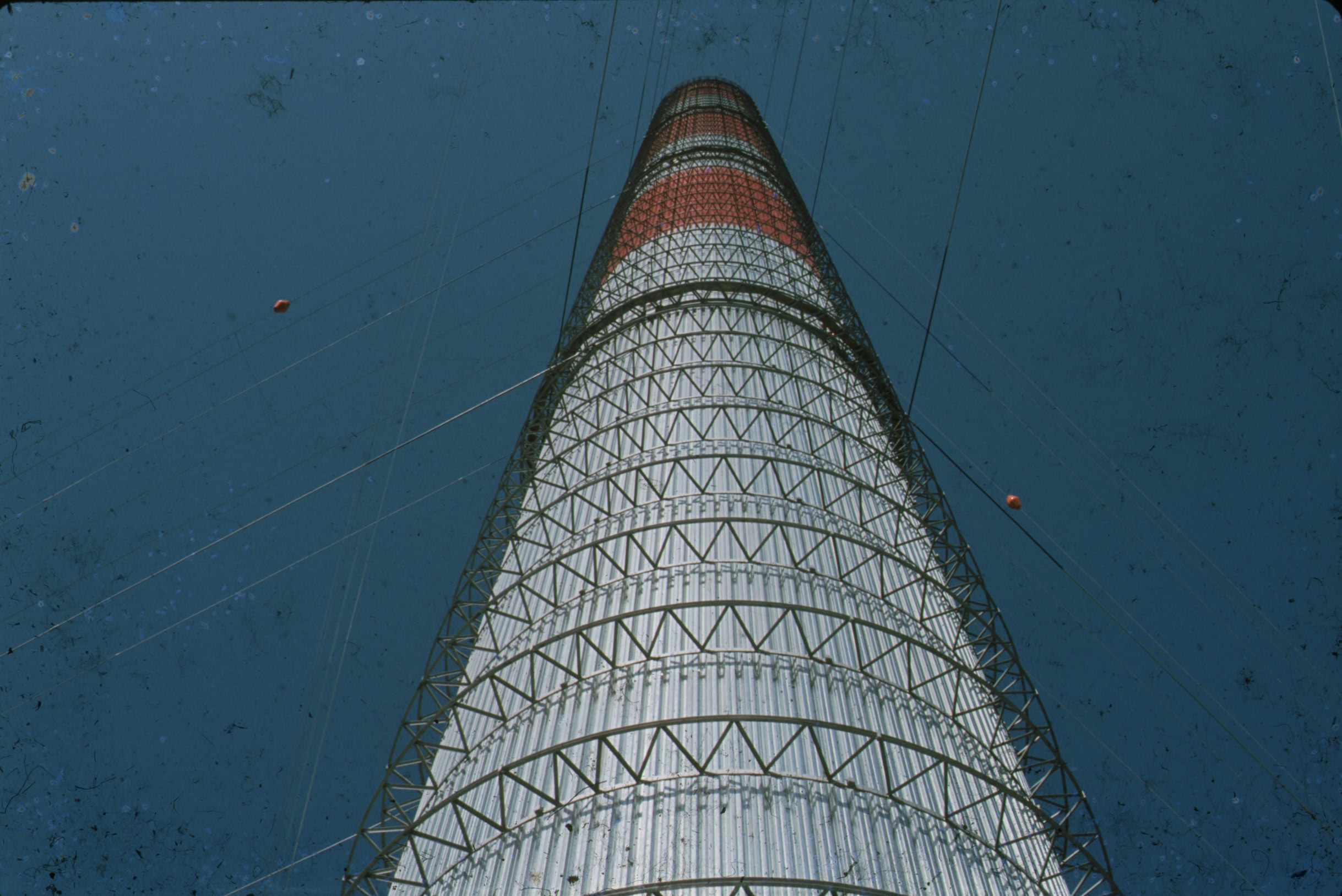
Manzanares Solar Chimney – view of the tower through the collector glass roof

In 2001, EnviroMission proposed to build a solar updraft tower power generating plant known as Solar Tower Buronga near Buronga, New South Wales. The company did not complete the project. They have plans for a similar plant in Arizona, and most recently (December 2013) in Texas, but there is no sign of 'breaking ground' in any of Enviromission's proposals.

In December 2011, Hyperion Energy, controlled by Western Australians Tony Sage and Dallas Dempster, was reported to be planning to build a 1-km-tall solar updraft tower near Meekatharra to supply power to Mid-West mining projects.

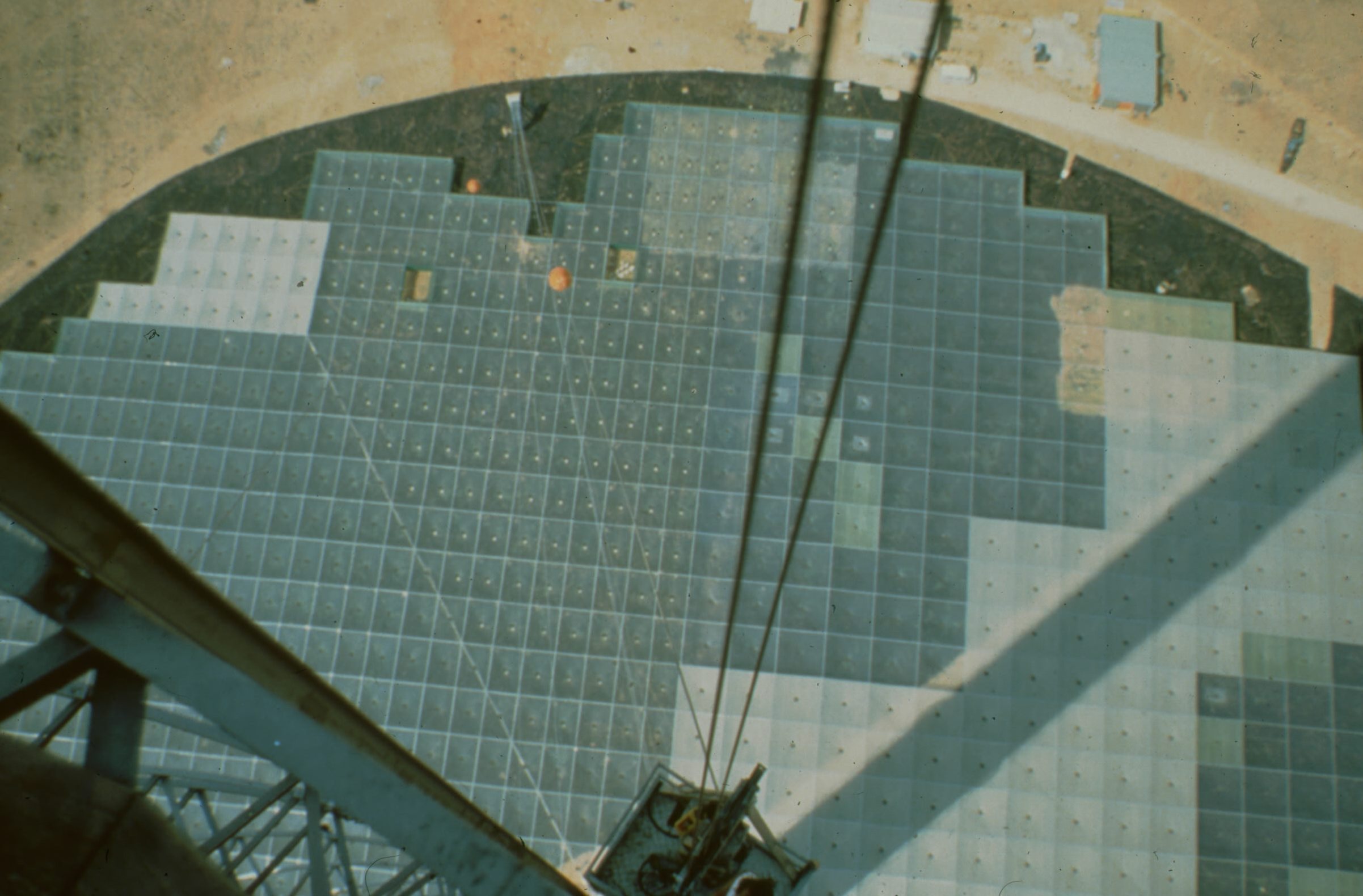
View from the tower on the roof with blackened ground below the collector. One can see the different test materials for canopy cover, and 12 large fields of unblackened ground for agricultural test area.

In mid-2008, the Namibian government approved a proposal for the construction of a 400 MW solar chimney called the 'Greentower'. The tower is planned to be 1.5 kilometres (4,900 ft) tall and 280 metres (920 ft) in diameter, and the base will consist of a 37 square kilometres (14 mi^{2}) greenhouse in which cash crops can be grown.

A model solar updraft tower was constructed in Turkey as a civil engineering project. Functionality and outcomes are obscure.

A second solar updraft tower using a transpired collector is operating at Trakya University in Edirne, Turkey, and is being used to test various innovations in SUT designs including the ability to recover heat from photovoltaic (PV) arrays.

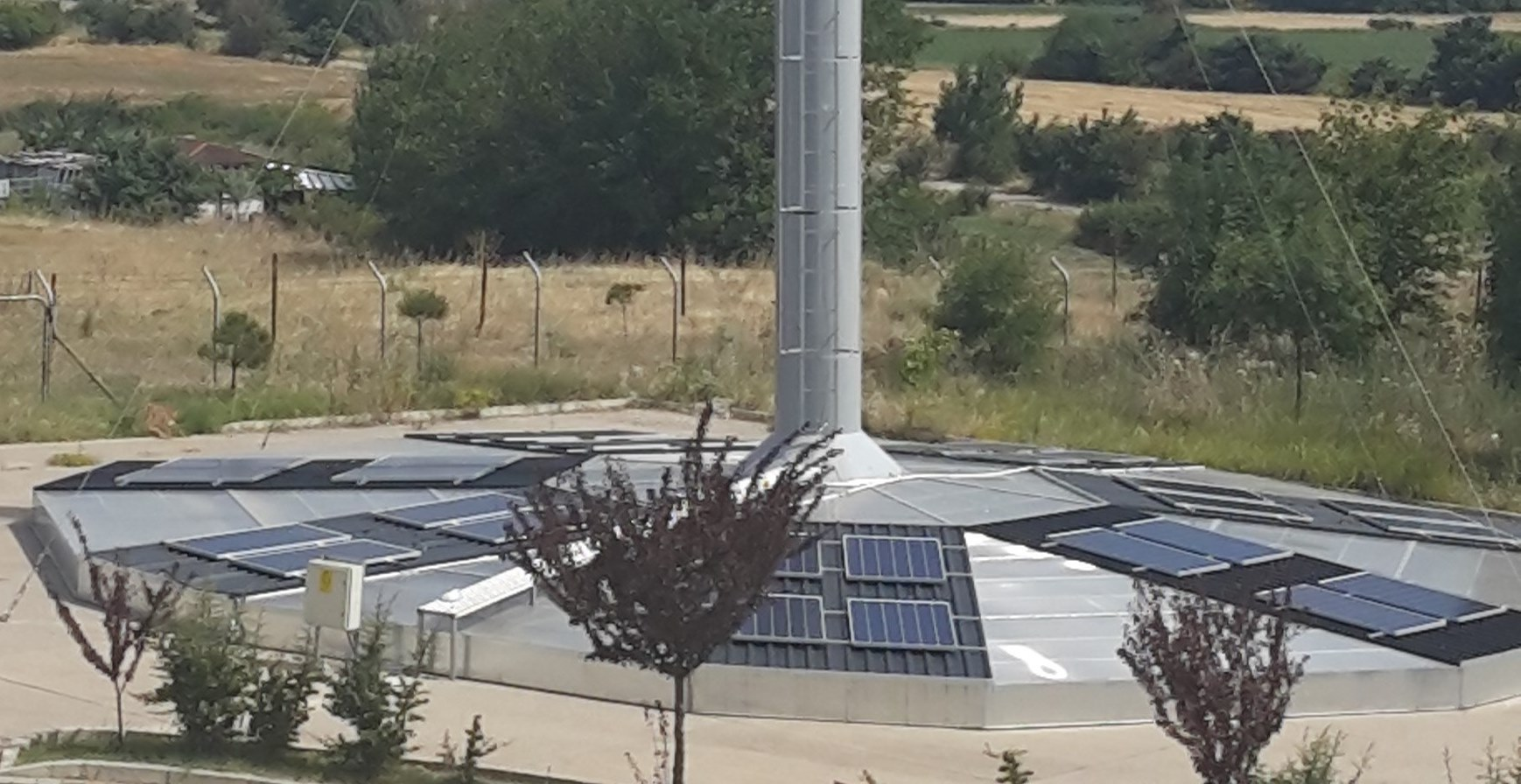
Solar towers can incorporate photovoltaic (PV) modules on transpired collectors for additional daytime output and the heat from PV array is utilised by the solar tower

A grade-school pupil's home do-it-yourself SUT demonstration for a school science fair was constructed and studied in 2012, in a suburban Connecticut setting. With a 7-metre stack and 100 square metre collector, this generated a daily average 6.34 mW, from a computer fan as a turbine. Insolation and wind were the major factors on variance (range from 0.12 to 21.78 mW) in output.

In Xi'an, central China, a 60-metre urban chimney with surrounding collector has significantly reduced urban air pollution. This demonstration project was led by Cao Jun Ji, a chemist at the Chinese Academy of Sciences' Key Laboratory of Aerosol Chemistry and Physics. This work has since been published on, with performance data and modelling.

== Efficiency ==
The traditional solar updraft tower has a power conversion rate considerably lower than many other designs in the (high temperature) solar thermal group of collectors. The low conversion rate is balanced to some extent by the lower cost per square metre of solar collection.

Model calculations estimate that a 100 MW plant would require a 1,000 m tower and a greenhouse of 20 square kilometres (7.7 sq mi). A 200 MW tower of the same height would require a collector 7 kilometres in diameter (total area of about 38 km^{2} (15 sq mi)). One 200 MW power station will provide enough electricity for around 200,000 typical households and will abate over 900,000 tons of greenhouse producing gases from entering the environment annually. The glazed collector area is expected to extract about 0.5 percent, or 5 W/m^{2} of 1 kW/m^{2}, of the solar energy that falls upon it. If a transpired solar collector is used in place of the glazed collector, the efficiency is doubled.

Additional efficiency improvements are possible by modifying the turbine and chimney design to increase air speed using a venturi configuration. Concentrating thermal (CSP) or photovoltaic (CPV) solar power plants range between 20% and 31.25% efficiency (dish Stirling). Overall CSP/CPV efficiency is reduced because collectors do not cover the entire footprint. Without further tests, the accuracy of these calculations is uncertain. Most of the projections of efficiency, costs and yields are calculated theoretically, rather than empirically derived from demonstrations, and are seen in comparison with other collector or solar heat transducing technologies.

An innovative concept recombining a thermal power plant dry cooling tower with a solar chimney was first introduced by Zandian and Ashjaee in 2013 to increase the efficiency of the solar updraft towers. This hybrid cooling-tower-solar-chimney (HCTSC) system was shown to be able to produce an over ten times increase in output power compared to the conventional solar chimney power plants like Manzanares, Ciudad Real, with similar geometrical dimensions. In addition, it was shown that with an increase in chimney diameter, the power generation can reach to MW-graded power output without the necessity of building huge individual solar chimney panels. The results showed a maximum of 3 MW power output from the HCTSC system which resulted in 0.37% increase in the thermal efficiency of a typical 250 MW fossil fuel power plant, with a chimney diameter of only 50 metres (160 ft). The new hybrid design made the solar updraft tower feasible again, and proved it to be economical in saving much construction cost and time. This concept also recaptures the heat of radiators that are thrown out into the atmosphere without efficient utilization, and prevents generation of excessive greenhouse gasses.

The performance of an updraft tower may be degraded by factors such as atmospheric winds, by drag induced by the bracings used for supporting the chimney, and by reflection off the top of the greenhouse canopy. However, updraft may be enhanced by crosswind at the upper level – creating a low pressure vortex across the top of the chimney would increase updraft.

== Related ideas and adaptations ==
=== Updraft ===
- The atmospheric vortex proposal replaces the physical chimney by a controlled or 'anchored' cyclonic updraft vortex. Depending on the column gradient of temperature and pressure, or buoyancy, and stability of the vortex, very high-altitude updraft may be achievable. As an alternative to a solar collector, industrial and urban waste-heat could be used to initiate and sustain the updraft in the vortex.
- Telescopic or retractable design may lower a very high chimney for maintenance, or to prevent storm damage. Hot-air balloon chimney suspension has also been proposed.
- A form of solar boiler technology placed directly above the turbine at the base of the tower might increase the up-draught.
- Moreno (2006) proposed that a chimney can be economically placed on a hill or mountain slope. Klinkman (2014) elaborated on constructing diagonal chimneys. A structure as simply built as a high hoop tunnel, but much longer in length and on a slope, can permanently generate an airflow for producing electricity. Changing the chimney's height differential from 200 m (the Manzanares experiment) to 2000 m (Charleston Peak in Nevada has a rise of over 2500 m, for example) will transfer a factor of ten more of captured solar heat into electric power. Increasing the temperature differential between chimney air and outside air by a factor of ten increases the same chimney's power by one further factor of ten, assuming that the chimney's walls are engineered to take the extra heat. Concentrating solar heat is often done with reflection.
- An inflatable solar chimney power plant has been evaluated analytically and simulated by computational fluid dynamics (CFD) modeling. This idea has been registered as a patent, including the optimal shape of the collector and the analytical profile for the self standing inflatable tower. The CFD simulation has been evaluated by verification, validation, and uncertainty quantification (VVUQ) of computer simulations by American Society of Mechanical Engineers 2009 standards.
- Airtower is a proposal by architect Julian Breinersdorfer to better exploit the high initial capital outlay of building a very high structure by incorporating it into a high rise building core. The proximity of producer and consumer can also reduce transmission losses.

=== Collector ===
- A saltwater thermal sink in the collector could 'flatten' the diurnal variation in energy output, while airflow humidification in the collector and condensation in the updraft could increase the energy flux of the system.
- As with other solar technologies, some mechanism is required to mix its varying power output with other power sources. Heat can be stored in heat-absorbing material or saltwater ponds. Electricity can be cached in batteries or other technologies.
- A recent innovation has been the use of transpired collectors in place of the traditional glazing covers. Transpired collectors have efficiencies in the 60% to 80% range or three times the 25% efficiency measured with the greenhouse collectors. The large solar collector field can now be reduced to half or less making solar updraft towers much more cost effective. A patent has been granted on a solar tower system using transpired collectors.

=== Applications ===
- Release of humid ground-level air from an atmospheric vortex or solar chimney at altitude could form clouds or precipitation, potentially altering local hydrology. Some of these ideas originated in work by Niewiadomski and Haman who studied cooling tower dynamics. Local de-desertification, or afforestation could be achieved if a regional water cycle were established and sustained in an otherwise arid area.
- The solar cyclone distiller could extract atmospheric water by condensation in the updraft of the chimney. This solar cyclonic water distiller in the updraft above a solar collector pond could adapt the solar collector-chimney system for large-scale desalination of collected brine, brackish- or waste-water pooled in the collector base.
- Fitted with a vortex chimney scrubber, the updraft could be cleaned of particulate air pollution. An experimental demonstration tower is cleaning the air in a Chinese city with little external energy input.
- Alternately to scrubbing, particulate air pollution caught in the updraft and released could serve as a nucleation stimulus for precipitation either in the chimney, or at release altitude as cloud seeds.
- Removal of urban air pollution raised and dispersed at altitude could reflect insolation, reducing ground-level solar warming.
- Energy production, water desalination or simple atmospheric water extraction could be used to support carbon-fixing or food-producing local agriculture, and for intensive aquaculture and horticulture under the solar collector as a greenhouse.
- A balloon-suspended lightweight extensible chimney anchored from an urban tether, rising from low level warm air to high altitude could remove low lying air pollution without the need for a broad collector at the base, given adequate height of release. This might improve air quality in highly polluted megacities without the burden and cost of major fixed construction.

== Capitalisation ==
A solar updraft power station would require a large initial capital outlay, but would have relatively low operating cost.

Capital outlays would be roughly the same as next-generation nuclear plants such as the AP-1000 at roughly $5 per watt of capacity. As with other renewable power sources, towers have no need for fuel. Overall costs are largely determined by interest rates and years of operation, varying from 5 eurocents per kWh for 4% and 20 years to 15 eurocents per kWh for 12% and 40 years.

Estimates of total costs range from 7 (for a 200 MW plant) and 21 (for a 5 MW plant) euro cents per kWh to 25–35 cents per kWh. The levelized cost of energy (LCOE) is approximately 3 Euro cents per KWh for a 100 MW wind or natural gas plant. No actual data are available for a utility-scale power plant.

== See also ==
- Energy tower (downdraft)
- Smog tower
- Solar pond
- Vortex engine
- Windcatcher
