= List of hypothetical technologies =

Possible future technology

Hypothetical technologies are technologies that do not exist yet, but that could exist in the future. They are distinct from emerging technologies, which have achieved some developmental success. Emerging technologies as of 2018 include 3-D metal printing and artificial embryos. Many hypothetical technologies have been the subject of science fiction.

The criteria for this list are that the technology:

1. Must not exist yet
2. Is credibly proposed to exist in the future (e.g. no perpetual motion machines)
3. If the technology does not have an existing article (i.e. it is "redlinked"), a reference must be provided for it

== Biology ==
- Acne vaccine
- Anti-evolutionary drug
- Antiprion drug
- Artificial gametes
- Artificial gill
- Artificial "super" mitochondria
- Caries vaccine
- De-extinction
- Dyson tree
- Ethnic bioweapon
- Female sperm
- Flying syringe
- Hair cloning
- HIV vaccine
- Humanzee
- Life extension
- Liquid breathing
- Male egg
- Nanochondrion
- Prime editing
- Respirocyte
- Synthetic epigenetics
- Universal flu vaccine
- Universal snakebite antidote

== Engineering and manufacturing ==
- Chitin-cellulose composite
- Diamond trees
- Exoskeletal engine
- Mezoelectronics
- Microfactory
- Piezer
- Tectonic weapon
- Vertical zoo
- Wearable generator

=== Computing and robotics ===
- Dentifrobot
- Hypercomputer
- Plant-based digital data storage
- Quantum memory
- Quantum money
- Robotoid
- Roll-away computer
- S-money
- Virtual cell
- Universal memory

=== Megastructures ===
- Cloud Nine (tensegrity sphere)
- Globus Cassus
- Seascraper
- Shellworld
- Vertical city

=== Nanotechnology ===
- Bush robot
- Claytronics
- Grey goo
- Mechanosynthesis
- Molecular assembler
- Nanocomputer
- Nanomatrix skyscraper
- Programmable matter
- Santa Claus machine
- Utility fog
- Wet nanotechnology
- Zettascale computing

=== Transport ===
- Bering Strait crossing
- ET3 Global Alliance
- Flying submarine
- Gravity train
- Gravity-vacuum transit
- Transatlantic tunnel
- Vacuum airship
- Water-fueled car

== Minds and psychology ==
- Artificial general intelligence
- Brainwashing
- Cortical modem
- Digital immortality
- Endoneurobot
- Eradication of suffering
- Gliabot
- Global brain
- Infomorph
- Intelligence amplification
- Isolated brain
- Matrioshka brain
- Memory editing
- Mind uploading
- Moral enhancement
- Simulated reality
- Superintelligence
- Synaptobot
- Technological singularity
- Thought recording and reproduction device
- Universal translator

== Physics ==
- Anti-gravity
- Antimatter weapon
- Non-rotational artificial gravity
- Cloaking device
- Computronium
- Electrogravitics
- Faster-than-light communication
- Femtotechnology
- Gravitational shielding
- Gamma-ray laser
- Monopolium
- Muon collider
- Neutronium
- Phased-array optics
- Picotechnology
- Plasmonster
- Room-temperature superconductor
- Space-time cloak
- Sphalerizer
- Tachyonic antitelephone
- Teleforce
- Teleporter
- Time machine
- Tipler cylinder
- Tractor beam

=== Nuclear energy and weaponry ===
- Cold fusion
- Fission fragment reactor
- Fusion torch
- Gas-cooled fast reactor
- Gas core reactor
- High-temperature superconducting stellarator
- Inertial fusion power plant
- Magnetic fusion power plant
- Microfission bomb
- Muon-catalyzed fusion reactor
- Nuclear bullet
- Nuclear clock
- Nuclear fusion–fission hybrid reactor
- Nuclear fusion bomb power plant
- Nuclear isomer bomb/Pure gamma-ray bomb
- Nuclear pulse-powered X-ray laser
- Nuclear-powered car
- Nuclear-powered cruise missile
- Nuclear-powered aircraft
- Nuclear-powered locomotive
- Nuclear-powered tank
- Nuclear shaped charge
- Pure fusion weapon
- Reduced moderation water reactor
- Subcritical fission bomb
- Supercritical water reactor
- Supercritical carbon dioxide reactor
- Transplutonic fission bomb
- Traveling wave reactor
- Very-high-temperature reactor

=== Space ===
- Alderson disk
- Alcubierre drive
- Antimatter rocket
- Artificial universe
- Asteroid laser ablation
- Beam powered propulsion
- Bernal sphere
- Bias drive
- Bishop ring
- Black hole starship
- Bracewell probe
- Bussard ramjet
- Dean drive
- Dipole drive
- Dyson sphere
- Dyson–Harrop satellite
- Enzmann starship
- Field propulsion
- Fission sail
- Ford-Svaiter mirror
- Fusion rocket
- Gas core reactor rocket
- Gravity tractor
- Halo drive
- Information panspermia
- Isotropic beacon
- Krasnikov tube
- Laser broom
- Laser propulsion
- Launch loop
- Lightcraft
- Liquid core nuclear propulsion
- Lunarcrete
- Lunar space elevator
- MagBeam
- Magnetic sail
- McKendree cylinder
- Momentum exchange tether
- Muon-catalyzed fusion propulsion
- Nano electrokinetic thruster
- Nanoship
- Non-rocket spacelaunch
- Nuclear electric rocket
- Nuclear lightbulb
- Nuclear photonic rocket
- Nuclear pulse propulsion
- Nuclear salt-water rocket
- Nuclear thermal rocket
- Pulsed nuclear thermal rocket
- Radioisotope rocket
- O'Neill cylinder
- Orbital ring
- Ouroboros habitat
- Photon rocket
- Photonic railway
- Pitch drive
- Plasma bubble
- Quantum telescope
- Quantum vacuum thruster
- Quasite
- Ringworld
- Reactionless drive
- RF resonant cavity thruster
- Rocket sled launch
- Rotating wheel space station
- Self-replicating spacecraft
- Skyhook
- Solar thermal rocket
- Space coach
- Space dock
- Space elevator
- Space fountain
- Space gun
- Space mirror
- Space tether
- Space tug
- Spomified asteroid
- Stanford torus
- Starlifting
- Starseed launcher
- StarTram
- Statite
- Stellar engine
- Sun scoop
- Terraforming
- Terrascope
- Thermonuclear micro-bomb engine
- Topopolis
- Wet workshop

== See also ==
- List of emerging technologies
- List of existing technologies predicted in science fiction
- List of fictional aircraft
- List of fictional artificial intelligences
- List of fictional cars
- List of fictional cyborgs
- List of fictional doomsday devices
- List of fictional galactic communities
- List of fictional robots and androids
  - List of fictional gynoids
- List of fictional space stations
- List of fictional spacecraft
- List of fictional vehicles
