= Alderson disk =

Hypothetical artificial solar megastructure

A schematic illustration of an Alderson disk

An Alderson disk (named after Dan Alderson, its originator) is a hypothetical artificial astronomical megastructure, similar to the ring in Larry Niven's Ringworld and the Dyson sphere. The disk is a giant platter with a thickness of several thousand kilometers. The Sun rests in the hole at the center of the disk. The outer perimeter of an Alderson disk would be roughly equivalent to the orbit of Mars or Jupiter. A big enough disk would have more mass than its Sun.

The hole would be surrounded by a thousand-kilometer-high wall to prevent the atmosphere from drifting into the Sun. The outer rim would not require a wall.

The mechanical stresses within the disc would be far beyond what any known material can stand, thus relegating such a structure to the realm of exploratory engineering until materials and construction science become advanced enough. Building a megastructure of this size would require far more material than is found in the Solar System.

Life could exist on either side of the disk, though life close to the Sun would be impossible without enough heat and other radiation protection. Conversely, beings living far from the Sun would freeze without heating equipment. Therefore, for all of such a structure to be habitable, it would have to include a vast number of life support systems. Even without such systems, the habitable surface area would be an equivalent of tens to hundreds of millions of Earths.

Since the Sun remains stationary, there is no day/night cycle, only a perpetual twilight. This could be solved by forcing the Sun to bob up and down within the disk, lighting one side and then the other.

== In popular culture ==
In 1974, science fiction writer Larry Niven suggested that an Alderson disk "would be a wonderful place to stage a gothic or sword and sorcery novel. The atmosphere is right, and there are real monsters." Since the zone habitable by humans is 'relatively narrow' (5% closer in and further out than Earth's current orbit would provide 50 million times the surface area of Earth), the disc (and the cost of its construction) could be shared with aliens from hotter and colder planets. Over long periods of time, lifeforms would evolve to settle the sparsely-inhabited regions in between. "If civilization should fall, things could get eerie and interesting."

An Alderson disk (the Godwheel) was a prominent feature of Malibu Comics' Ultraverse. The Godwheel was split between two societies, one which used technology and one which used magic (each occupied its own side of the disk). Larry Niven designed the Godwheel and wrote stories surrounding certain events on it.

Rak Mesba is a partial ancient alien Alderson Disk in Orion's Arm, a multi-authored online science fiction world-building project.

A disk-shaped planet similar to an Alderson disk (though far smaller) served as the homeworld of the fantasy "Aysle" setting (or "cosm") of West End Games' Torg roleplaying game. In contrast with the Alderson disk, the Aysle "diskworld" works according to fantasy physics, including a "gravity plane" that bisects the disk laterally, so that opposite sides "fall" towards the plane. The diskworld of Aysle had a bobbing Sun and multiple inner layers. Both sides of the disk were inhabited, as were the internal layers.

In Charles Stross's Missile Gap, a copy of the whole Earth (along with copies of many other planets) is placed on an Alderson disk built around a black hole by unknown forces.

Ian McDonald's novel Empress of the Sun features a parallel-universe version of the Solar System where creatures evolved from dinosaurs have converted all the mass to an Alderson disk (with a bobbing sun).

In Terry Pratchett's science fiction novel Strata the concept of an Alderson disk is brought up by the protagonist, Kin Arad, as an explanation for the mysterious 'flat Earth' that is the focus of the story.

In Gigastructural Engineering & More, a popular modification to the 4X game Stellaris, the Alderson Disk is featured as a buildable megastructure inhabitable by the player.

In the game Honkai: Star Rail, the planet of Penacony is actually a large artificial space station-like megastructure housing a hotel surrounded by two small Alderson disks orbiting it.

== See also ==
- Dyson tree – Hypothetical genetically-engineered plant capable of growing inside a comet
- Globus Cassus – Art project and book by Christian Waldvogel
- Kardashev scale – Measure of a civilization's evolution
- Klemperer rosette – Type of gravitational system
- Matrioshka brain – Huge computer powered by a star's energy
- Megascale engineering – Very large artificial object
- Planetary engineering – Influencing a planet's global environments
- Star lifting – Hypothetical process of mining a star for resources
- Tabby's Star – Star noted for unusual dimming events
- Tensegrity – Structural design made of isolated members held in place by tension
- Terraforming – Hypothetical planetary engineering process
