= Megastructure =

Very large artificial object

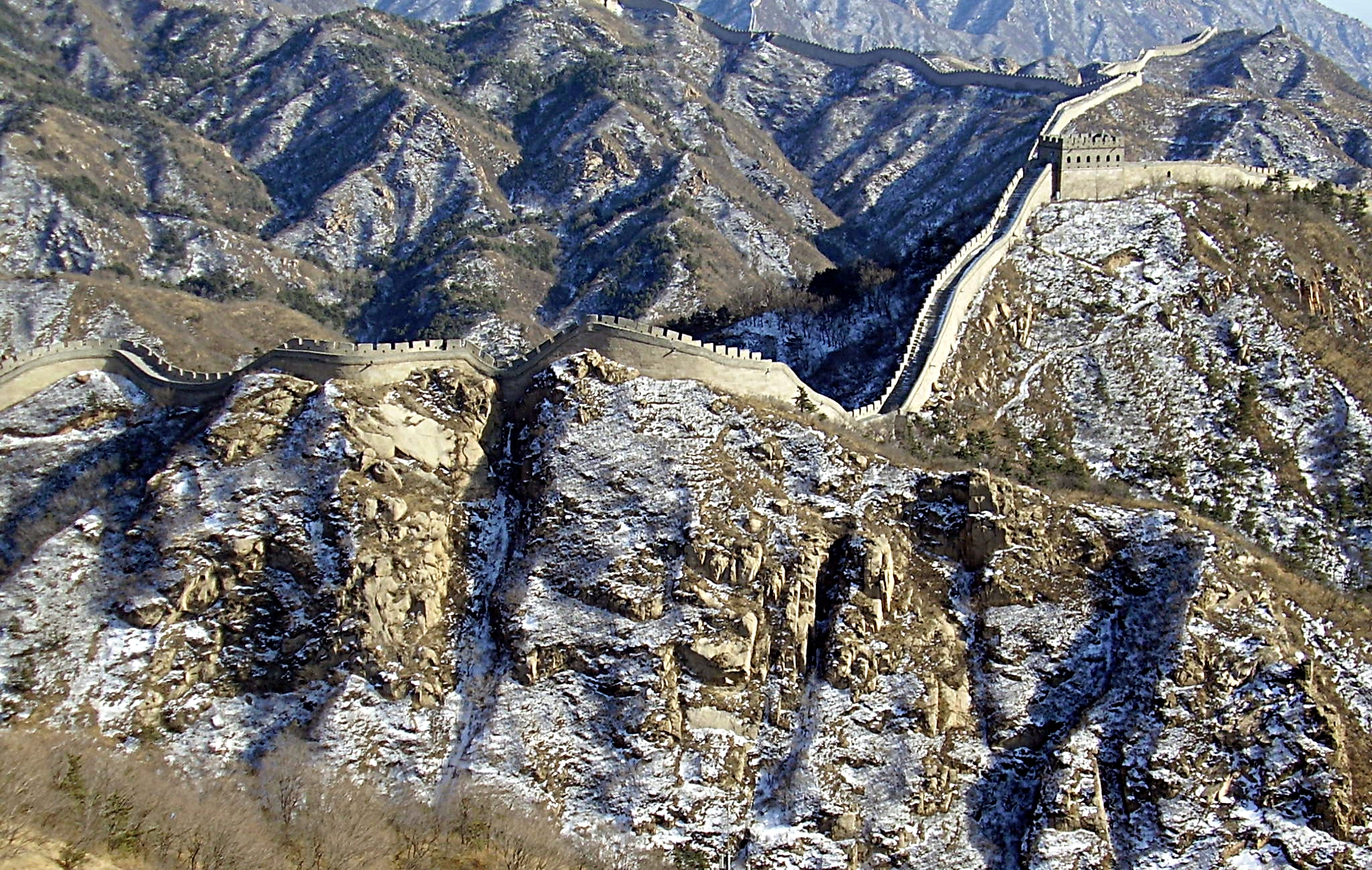
The Great Wall of China, at 6,352 km or 3,947 mi long, is an ancient era megaproject. This picture was taken near Beijing in February 2005.

A megastructure (or macrostructure) is a very large artificial object, although the limits of precisely how large vary considerably. Some apply the term to any especially large or tall building. Some sources define a megastructure as an enormous self-supporting artificial construct.

Most megastructure designs could not be constructed with today's level of industrial technology. This makes their design examples of speculative (or exploratory) engineering. Those that could be constructed tend to qualify as megaprojects. Examples of megaprojects are the Great Wall of China, Zuiderzee Works in the Netherlands and Burj Khalifa in Dubai.

Megastructures are also an architectural concept popularised in the 1960s where a city could be encased in a single building, or a relatively small number of buildings interconnected.

In 1968, Ralph Wilcoxen defined a megastructure as any structural framework into which rooms, houses, or other small buildings can later be installed, uninstalled, and replaced; and which is capable of "unlimited" extension. This type of framework allows the structure to adapt to the individual wishes of its residents, even as those wishes change with time.

Other sources define a megastructure as "any development in which residential densities are able to support services and facilities essential for the development to become a self-contained community".

Many architects have designed such megastructures. Some of the more notable such architects and architectural groups include the Metabolist Movement, Archigram, Cedric Price, Frei Otto, Constant Nieuwenhuys, Yona Friedman, and Buckminster Fuller.

== Proposed ==
- Atlantropa, a hydroelectric dam to be built across the Strait of Gibraltar, lowering the surface of the Mediterranean Sea by as much as 200 meters.
- Trans-Global Highway, highway systems that would link all six of the inhabited continents on Earth. The highway would network new and existing bridges and tunnels, not only improving ground transportation but also potentially offering a conduit for utility pipelines.
- Cloud Nine (sphere) is Buckminster Fuller's proposal for a tensegrity sphere a mile in radius which would be large enough so that it would float in the sky if heated by only one degree above ambient temperature, creating habitats for mini cities of thousands of people in each "Cloud Nine". Fuller also proposed a marine analog consisting of a hollow terraced floating tetrahedron of reinforced concrete measuring one mile from vertex to vertex supporting a population of one million living in air-deployed residential modules on the exterior with the requisite infrastructure providing utilities (water, power, sewerage, etc.) inside. The modules would have standardized utility ports so as to be completely livable within minutes of arrival, and could be subsequently detached and moved to other such cities.
- The Line, a 170-kilometer-long linear settlement in Saudi Arabia, a smart city currently cancelled.

== Theoretical ==
A number of theoretical structures have been proposed that may be considered megastructures.

=== Stellar scale ===
A cut-away diagram of an idealized Dyson sphere—a variant on Dyson's original concept—1 AU in radius.

Most stellar scale megastructure proposals are designs to make use of the energy from a sun-like star while possibly still providing gravity or other attributes that would make it attractive for an advanced civilization.

- The Alderson disk is a theoretical structure in the shape of a disk, whose outer radius is equivalent to the orbit of Mars or Jupiter and whose thickness is several thousand kilometers. A civilization could live on either side, held by the gravity of the disk and still receive sunlight from a star bobbing up and down in the middle of the disk.
- A Dyson sphere is a structure or mass of orbiting objects that completely surrounds a star to make full use of its solar energy.
- A Matrioshka brain is a collection of multiple concentric Dyson spheres which make use of a star's energy for computing.
- A Stellar engine either uses the temperature difference between a star and interstellar space to extract energy or serves as a Shkadov thruster.
- A Shkadov thruster accelerates an entire star through space by selectively reflecting or absorbing light on one side of it.
- Star lifting is a process where an advanced civilization could remove a substantial portion of a star's matter in a controlled manner for other uses.
- Topopolis (also known as Cosmic Spaghetti) is a large tube that rotates to provide artificial gravity.
- A Ringworld (also known as a Niven Ring or a Dyson Ring) is an artificial ring encircling a star, rotating faster than orbital velocity to create artificial gravity on its inner surface. A non-rotating variant is a transparent ring of breathable gas, creating a continuous microgravity environment around the star, as in the eponymous Smoke Ring.

Related structures which might not be classified as individual stellar megastructures, but occur on a similar scale:

- A Dyson swarm is a Dyson sphere made up of separately orbiting elements (including large habitats) rather than a single continuous shell.
- A Dyson bubble is a Dyson sphere in which the individual elements are statites, non-orbital objects held aloft by the pressure of sunlight.

=== Planetary scale ===
- A Bishop Ring, Halo or Orbital is a space habitat similar to but much smaller than a Niven Ring. Instead of being centered on a star, it is in orbit around the star and its diameter is typically on the order of magnitude of a planet. By tilting the ring relative to its orbit, the inner surface would experience a nearly conventional day and night cycle. Due to its enormous scale, the habitat would not need to be fully enclosed like the Stanford torus, instead, its atmosphere would be retained solely by centripetal gravity and side walls, allowing an open sky.
- Globus Cassus is a hypothetical proposed project for the transformation of Planet Earth into a much bigger, hollow, artificial world with the ecosphere on its inner surface. This model serves as a tool to understand the World's real functioning processes.
- Shellworlds or paraterraforming are inflated shells holding high pressure air around an otherwise airless world to create a breathable atmosphere. The pressure of the contained air supports the weight of the shell.
- Completely hollow shell worlds can also be created on a planetary or larger scale by contained gas alone, also called gravitational balloons, as long as the outward pressure from the contained gas balances the gravitational contraction of the entire structure, resulting in no net force on the shell. The scale is limited only by the mass of gas enclosed, the shell can be made of any mundane material. The shell can have an additional atmosphere on the outside.
- It can also refer to terraformed or artificial planets with multiple concentric layers.

=== Orbital structures ===
- An orbital ring is a dynamically elevated ring placed around the Earth that rotates at an angular rate that is faster than orbital velocity at that altitude, stationary platforms can be supported by the excess centripetal acceleration of the super-orbiting ring (similar in principle to a Launch loop), and ground-tethers can be supported from stationary platforms.
- The Bernal sphere is a proposal for a spherical space colony with a maximum diameter of 16 kilometers. It would have gravity at the equator, and gradually turn to zero G at the poles.
- Rotating wheel space stations, such as the Stanford torus, are wheel-like space station which produce artificial gravity by rotation. Typical designs include transport spokes to a central hub used for docking and/or micro-gravity research.
- The related concepts, O'Neill and McKendree cylinders, are both pairs of counter-rotating cylinders containing habitable areas inside and creating 1g on their inner surfaces via centripetal acceleration. The scale of each concept came from estimating the largest 1g cylinder that could be built from steel (O'Neill) or carbon fiber (McKendree).
- Hollowed asteroids (or Bubble worlds or Terraria) are spun on their axis for simulated gravity and filled with air, allowing them to be inhabited on the inside. In some concepts, the asteroid is heated to molten rock and inflated into its final form.
- A set of structures to keep Earth habitable beyond the death of the Sun: A large sunshade placed at the L1 point and an artificial sun powered by fusion reactors in Jupiter's atmosphere. The megastructures could theoretically keep Earth habitable for 9 quadrillion years.

=== Trans-orbital structures ===
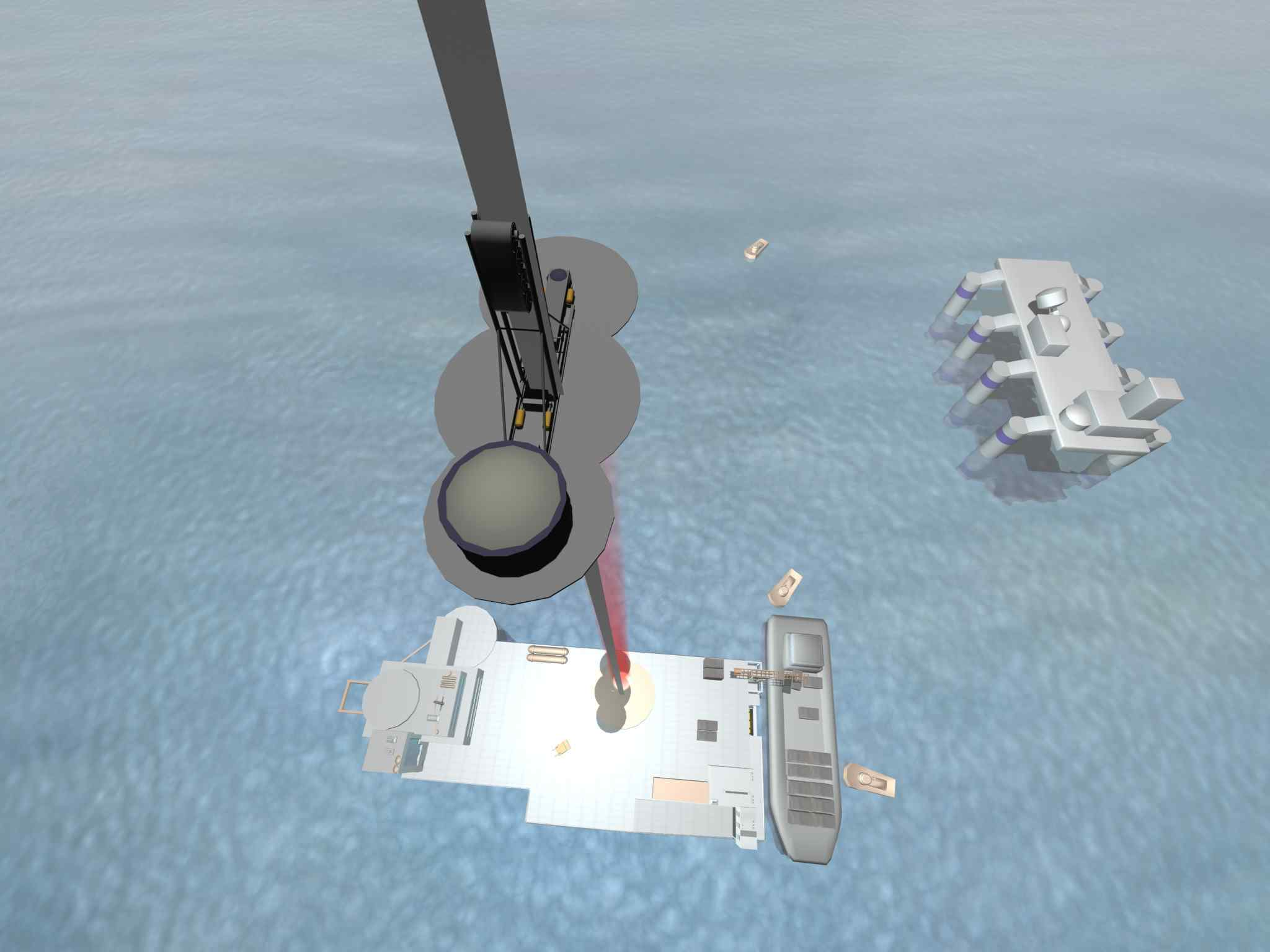
One concept for the space elevator has it tethered to a mobile seagoing platform.

- A skyhook is a very long tether that hangs down from orbit.
- A space elevator is a tether that is fixed to the ground, extending beyond geostationary orbital altitude, such that centripetal force exceeds gravitational force, leaving the structure under slight outward tension.
- A space fountain is a dynamically supported structure held up by the momentum of masses which are shot up to the top at high speeds from the ground.
- A launch loop (or Lofstrom loop) is a dynamically supported 2,000-kilometre-long (1,200 mi) iron loop that projects up in an arc to 80 kilometres (50 mi) that is ridden by maglev cars while achieving orbital velocity.
- StarTram Generation 2 is a maglev launch track extending from the ground to above 96% of the atmosphere's mass, supported by magnetic levitation.
- A rotovator is a rotating tether whose lower tip moves in the opposite direction to the tether's orbital velocity, reducing the difference in velocity with the ground, and hence reducing the velocity of rendezvous; the upper tip is likewise moving at greater than orbital velocity, allowing propellantless transfer between orbits. Around an airless world, such as the Moon, the lower tip can actually touch the ground with zero horizontal velocity. As with any momentum exchange tether, orbital energy is gained or lost in the transfer.

== See also ==
- Arcology
- Skyscraper
- List of visionary tall buildings and structures
- Gigantomania
