= Zettascale computing =

Measure of supercomputer performance

Zettascale computing refers to computing systems capable of calculating at least "10^{21} IEEE 754 Double Precision (64-bit) operations (multiplications and/or additions) per second (zettaFLOPS)". It is a measure of supercomputer performance, and as of July 2022 is a hypothetical performance barrier.

== Definitions ==
Floating point operations per second (FLOPS) are one measure of computer performance. FLOPS can be recorded in different measures of precision, however the standard measure (used by the TOP500 supercomputer list) uses 64 bit (double-precision floating-point format) operations per second using the High Performance LINPACK (HPLinpack) benchmark.

== Forecasts ==
In 2018, Chinese scientists predicted that the first zettascale system will be assembled in 2035. This forecast looks plausible from a historical point of view as it took some 12 years to progress from the terascale machines (10^{12}) to petascale systems (10^{15}) and then 14 more years to move to exascale computers (10^{18}).

Scientists forecast that the zettascale systems are likely to be data-centric; this proposition means that the system components will move to the data, not vice versa, as the data volumes in the future are anticipated to be so large that moving data will be too expensive. It is also forecasted that zettascale systems are expected to be decentralized—because such a model can be the shortest route to achieving zettascale performance, with millions of less powerful components linked and working together to form a collective hypercomputer that is more powerful than any single machine. Such decentralized systems may be designed to mimick complex biologic systems, and the next cybernetic paradigm may be based on liquid cybernetic systems with embodied intelligence solutions.

=== Potential configuration ===
China's National University of Defense Technology propose the following metrics:

- Power consumption: 100 MW
- Power efficiency: 10 teraflops/watt
- Peak performance per node: 10 petaflops
- Communication bandwidth between nodes: 1.6 terabits/second
- I/O bandwidth: 10 to 100 petabytes/second
- Storage capacity: 1.0 zettabyte
- Floor space: 1000 square meters

== Problems ==
As Moore's law nears its natural limits, supercomputing will face serious physical problems in moving from exascale to zettascale systems, making the decade after 2020 a vital period to develop key high-performance computing techniques. Many forecasters, including Gordon Moore himself, expect Moore's law to end by around 2025. Another challenge for reaching zettascale performance can be enormous energy consumption.

== Applications ==
- Zettascale computers will be able to accurately forecast global weather for 2 weeks in the future.
- Zettascale computers will also be able to significantly reduce the time required for astrophysical simulations of rare phenomena such as black holes, neutron star mergers, and supernovae. For example, calculating a 3D model of shock wave instability from a collapsing supernova core, which takes 1 million hours on petascale computers and 1000 hours on exascale machines, can be done in just one hour on zettascale systems.
- Zettascale or yottascale systems might be able to accurately model the whole human brain.

== See also ==
- Computer performance by orders of magnitude
- Exascale computing
- Petascale computing
- List of hypothetical technologies
