= Statite =

Hypothetical satellite which would use a solar sail to modify its orbit

A statite (a portmanteau of the words static and satellite) is a hypothetical type of artificial satellite that employs a solar sail to continuously modify its orbit in ways that gravity alone would not allow. Typically, a statite would use the solar sail to "hover" in a location that would not otherwise be available as a stable geosynchronous orbit. Statites have been proposed that would remain in fixed locations high over Earth's poles, using reflected sunlight to counteract the gravity pulling them down. Statites might also employ their sails to change the shape or velocity of more conventional orbits, depending upon the purpose of the particular statite.

The concept of the statite was invented independently and at about the same time by Robert L. Forward (who coined the term "statite") and Colin McInnes, who used the term "halo orbit" (not to be confused with the type of halo orbit discovered by Robert Farquhar). Subsequently, the terms "non-Keplerian orbit" and "artificial Lagrange point" have been used as a generalization of the above terms.

No statites have been deployed to date, as solar sail technology remains in its infancy. NASA's cancelled Sunjammer solar sail mission had the stated objective of flying to an artificial Lagrange point near the Earth/Sun L1 point, to demonstrate the feasibility of the Geostorm geomagnetic storm warning mission concept proposed by NOAA's Patricia Mulligan. A constellation of statites has been proposed for performing a rendezvous with an interstellar object.

A so-called quasite is a variation of a statite, being slightly unbalanced to allow other forces to balance its position, though having a slow orbit. This is employed in the proposal by David Kipping for a so-called Torqued Accelerator using Radiation from the Sun (TARS) slingshot accelerator, essentially being a light mill in space.

== See also ==
- Dyson bubble
- List of hypothetical technologies
- Solar mirror
- Space sunshade
