= Stellar engine =

Class of hypothetical megastructures

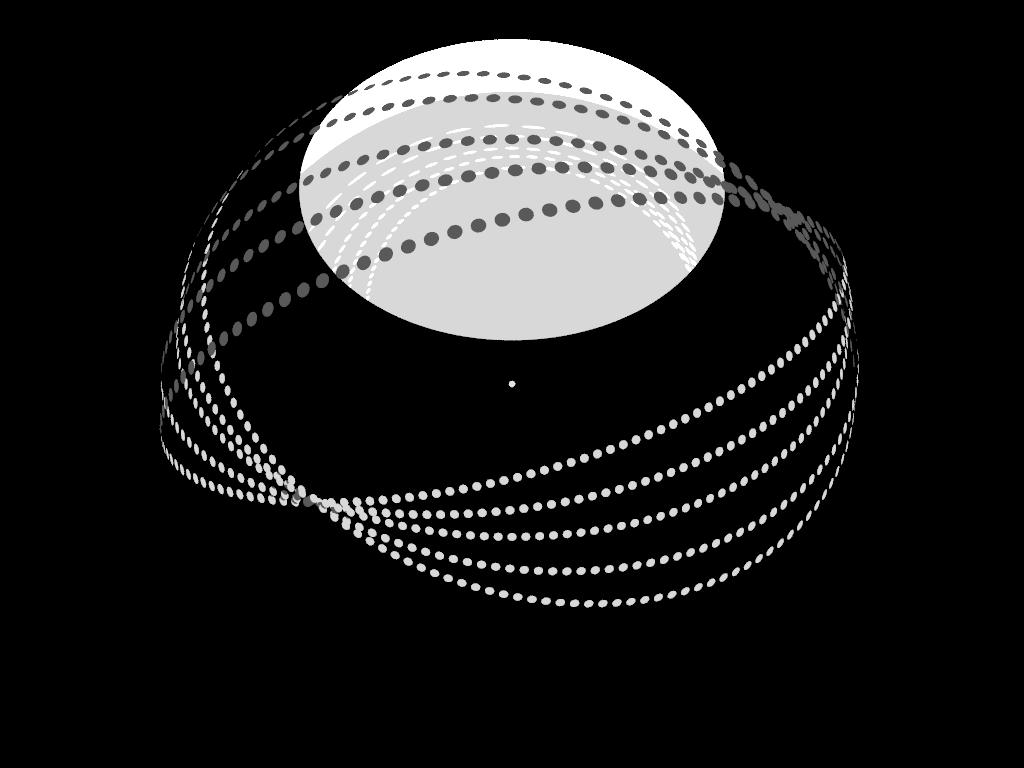
Diagram of a class-C stellar engine (to scale) built around a Sun-like star. It consists of a partial Dyson swarm composed of 5 Dyson rings of solar collectors (the class-B component), and a large statite Shkadov thruster (the class-A component). Perspective is from below the system's ecliptic at a distance of ~2.8 AU. The system's direction of acceleration is on a vector from the center of the star through the center of the Shkadov thruster, which is hovering over the star's north pole (with regards to the ecliptic), at a distance of 1 AU.

Stellar engines are a class of hypothetical megastructures which use the resources of a star to generate available work (also called exergy). For instance, they can use the energy of the star to produce mechanical, electrical or chemical work, or they can use the impulse of the light emitted by the star to produce thrust, thus controlling the motion of the star system. The variants which produce thrust may accelerate a star and anything orbiting it in a given direction. The creation of such a system would make its builders a Type II civilization on the Kardashev scale.

Proposed applications for stellar engines include moving a star system to avoid astrophysical hazards, such as the supernova of a neighboring star, or to come into close proximity to another system in order to colonize it.

== Classes ==
Four classes of stellar engines have been defined.

=== Class A (Shkadov thruster) ===
One of the simplest examples of a stellar engine is the Shkadov thruster (named after Dr. Leonid Shkadov, who first proposed it), or a class-A stellar engine. Such an engine is a stellar propulsion system, consisting of an enormous mirror/light sail—actually a massive type of solar statite large enough to classify as a megastructure—which would balance gravitational attraction towards and radiation pressure away from the star. Since the radiation pressure of the star would now be asymmetrical, i.e. more radiation being emitted in one direction as compared to another, the "excess" radiation pressure acts as net thrust, accelerating the star in the direction of the hovering statite. Such thrust and acceleration would be very slight, but such a system could be stable for millennia. Any planetary system attached to the star would be "dragged" along by its parent star. For a star such as the Sun, with luminosity 3.85×10^{26} W and mass 1.99×10^{30} kg, the total thrust produced by reflecting half of the solar output would be 1.28×10^{18} N. After a period of one million years this would yield an imparted speed of 20 m/s, with a displacement from the original position of 0.03 light-years. After one billion years, the speed would be 20 km/s and the displacement 34,000 light-years, a little over a third of the estimated width of the Milky Way galaxy.

=== Class B ===
A class-B stellar engine consists of two concentric spheres around a star. The inner sphere (which may be amalgamated into a Dyson shell) receives energy from the star and becomes hotter than the outer sphere. The difference of temperature between the two spheres drives thermal engines able to provide mechanical work.

Unlike the Shkadov thruster, a class-B stellar engine is not propulsive.

=== Class C ===
A class-C stellar engine, such as the Badescu–Cathcart engine, combines the two other classes, employing both the propulsive aspects of the Shkadov thruster and the energy generating aspects of a class-B engine. A higher temperature Dyson shell partially covered by a mirror combined with an outer sphere at a lower temperature would be one incarnation of such a system. The non-spherical mirror ensures conversion of light impulse into effective thrust (like a class-A stellar engine) while the difference of temperature may be used to convert star energy into mechanical work (like a class-B stellar engine). Notice that such system suffers from the same stabilization problems as a non-propulsive shell, as would be a Dyson swarm with a large statite mirror (see image above). A Dyson bubble variant is already a Shkadov thruster (provided that the arrangement of statite components is asymmetrical).

=== Class D ===
A class D stellar engine uses a star's mass to propel the star. Particular class D stellar engines are the stellar rocket described in 1989, based on a modification of the concept of "star lifting" proposed in 1985, the Caplan thruster proposed in 2019 and the Svoronos Star Tug proposed in 2020.

==== Caplan thruster ====
Astronomer Matthew E. Caplan of Illinois State University has proposed a type of stellar engine that uses concentrated stellar energy (repurposing the mirror statites from class A) to excite certain regions of the outer surface of the star and create beams of solar wind for collection by a multi-Bussard ramjet assembly. The ramjets would produce directed plasma to stabilize its orbit and jets of oxygen-14 to push the star. Using rudimentary calculations that assume maximum efficiency, Caplan estimates that the Bussard engine would use 10^{12} kg of solar material per second to produce a maximum acceleration of 10^{−9} m/s^{2}, yielding a velocity of 200 km/s after 5 million years and a distance of 10 parsecs over 1 million years. While theoretically the Bussard engine would work for 100 million years, given the mass loss rate of the Sun, Caplan deems 10 million years to be sufficient for a stellar collision avoidance. His proposal was commissioned by the German educational YouTube channel Kurzgesagt.

==== Svoronos Star Tug ====
Alexander A. Svoronos of Yale University proposed the 'Star Tug', a concept that combines aspects of the Shkadov thruster and Caplan engine to produce an even more powerful and efficient mechanism for controlling a star's movement. Essentially, it replaces the giant parabolic mirror of the Shkadov thruster with an engine powered by mass lifted from the star, similar to the Caplan engine. However, instead of pushing a star from behind with a beam of thrust, as the Caplan engine does, it pulls the star from the front via gravity, like the Shkadov thruster. As a result, it only needs to produce a single beam of thrust (toward but narrowly missing the star), whereas the Caplan engine must produce two beams of thrust (one to push the star from behind and negate the force of gravity between the engine and the star, and one to propel the system as a whole forward). The result is that the Svoronos Star Tug is a much more efficient engine capable of significantly higher accelerations and max velocities. The Svoronos Star Tug can, in principle (assuming perfect efficiency), accelerate the Sun to ~27% the speed of light (after burning enough of the Sun's mass to transition it to a brown dwarf).

=== Polar mass flow ===
Harry proposed mining hydrogen from Jupiter's atmosphere and lifting it into orbit using an orbital ring. The hydrogen would then be launched above or below the Sun's north or south poles throughout the Jovian year. The gravitational deflection of the mass flow would gradually impart an acceleration on the Sun in the north or south direction. Harry proposed this as a method for the solar system to avoid a disruptive encounter with another star. The system would launch hydrogen from Jupiter at 19 km per second and require one millionth of Jupiter's total hydrogen reserve, resulting in the solar system deflecting by 100 au after one million years. The system would be powered by helium fusion reactors in Jupiter's atmosphere.

== In fiction ==
- The Bowl of Heaven series of novels involves an enormous alien structure around a star (the eponymous Bowl) which serves as both living space and as a Class D stellar engine. This structure is shaped like an actual bowl with a hole in the center, through which a jet of plasma from the star (the engine's exhaust) can escape.
- Various kinds of stellar engines are used in the Orion's Arm worldbuilding project. One alien civilization, the Sundrivers, is so named because they have been observed moving many stars into a spherical volume of space. The Sundrivers are hypothesized to be using reactionless drive technology for this.

== See also ==
- Dyson spheres
