= Cageworld series =

Science fiction series by Colin Kapp

- Cageworld #1, Search For The Sun
- Author: Colin Kapp
- Cover artist: Vincent Difate
- Publisher: DAW Books
- Publication date: 1982-1984

The Cageworld series is a science fiction series by Colin Kapp which takes place in a distant future where humanity lives on nested Dyson spheres. The four books are Search for the Sun (1982) (also published as Cageworld); The Lost Worlds of Cronus (1982); The Tyrant of Hades (1984) and Star Search (1984).
