= David Kipping =

British astronomer and associate professor

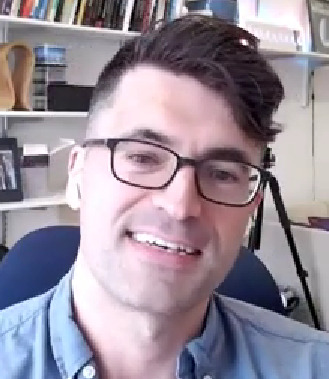
- Kipping in 2023
- Born: David Matthew Kipping; 1983 or 1984; United Kingdom
- Education: Cambridge University (MA, MSc); UCL (PhD)
- Occupations: Associate professor, astronomer, YouTuber
- Scientific career
- Fields: Astronomy, astrophysics, exomoons
- Institutions: Columbia University
- Thesis: The Transits of Extrasolar Planets with Moons (2011)
- Doctoral advisor: Giovanna Tinetti

YouTube information
- Channel: Cool Worlds
- Years active: 2016–present
- Genre: Science Communication
- Subscribers: 1M
- Views: 95,167,989
- Last updated: 15 February 2025
- Website: www.coolworldslab.com

David Mathew Kipping is a British astronomer and associate professor at Columbia University, where he leads the Cool Worlds Lab.

== Early life and education ==
Kipping grew up in Warwickshire. He studied at the University of Cambridge, where he received an MA degree in 2006 and an MSc degree in 2007, both in Natural Sciences. He subsequently obtained a PhD degree in Physics and Astronomy from the University College London in 2011.

== Career ==
Following the completion of his doctorate, he was a postdoctoral fellow at the Smithsonian Institution for six months in 2011. He then undertook a postdoctoral fellowship at Harvard University from 2011 to 2015, before joining Columbia University as an assistant professor in 2015. In 2016, Kipping launched the YouTube channel Cool Worlds to share his research topics with the wider public.

Along with Ingo Waldmann and Steve Fossey, Kipping discovered in 2009 that the exoplanet HD 80606b (previously known from radial velocity) transits its host star.

In 2011 Kipping founded the Hunt for Exomoons with Kepler, a project that searches for exomoons, natural satellites of exoplanets, using data collected by the Kepler space telescope.

In 2019 Kipping proposed a method of spaceflight known as the Halo Drive.
