= Bussard ramjet =

Proposed spacecraft propulsion method

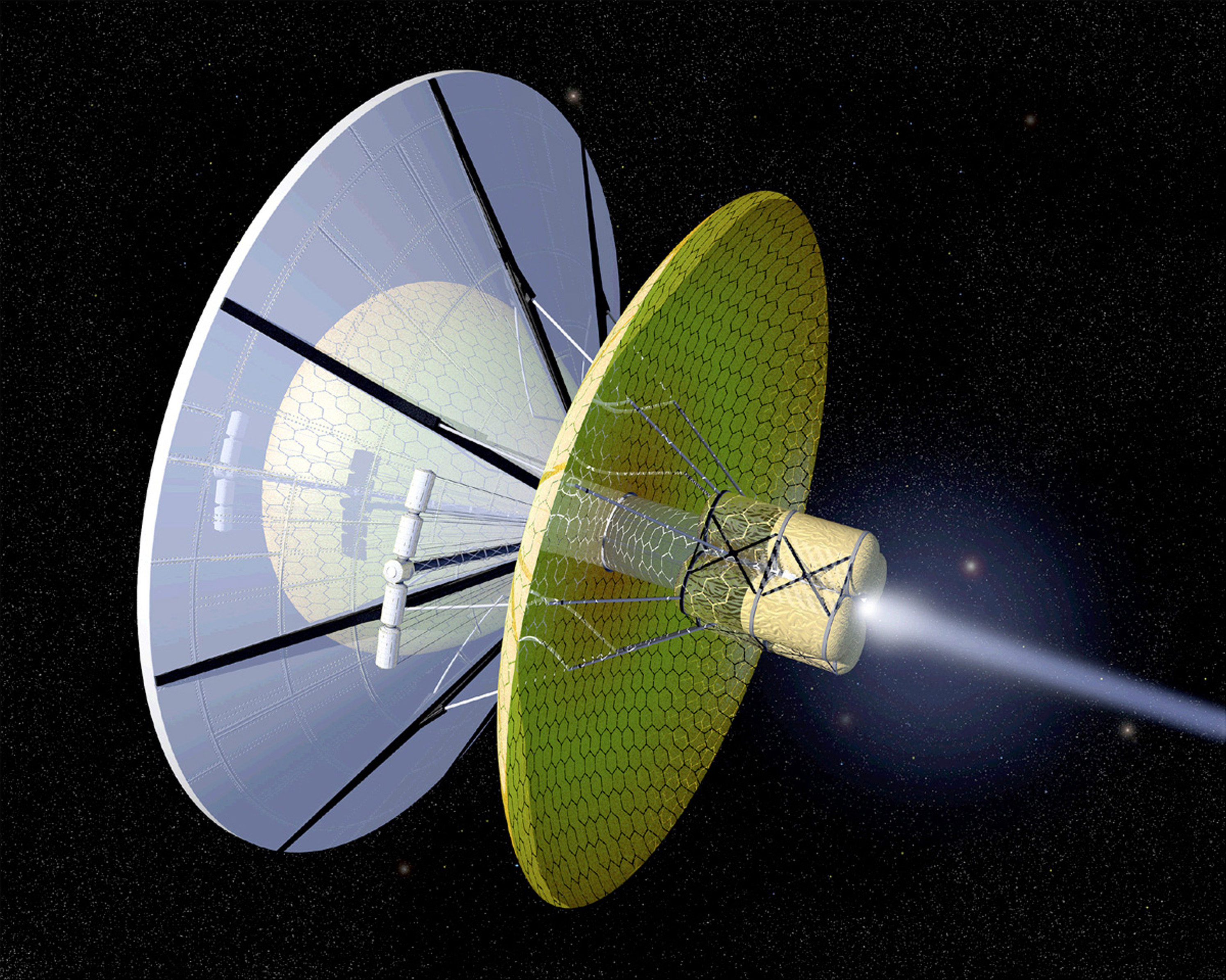
Artist's conception of a Bussard ramjet. A major component of an actual ramjet – a miles-wide electromagnetic field – is invisible.

Bussard ramjet in motion: 1. Interstellar medium; 2. Collect and compress hydrogen; 3. Transport hydrogen beside the payload; 4. Thermonuclear fusion; 5. Engine nozzle; 6. Flue gas jet

The Bussard ramjet is a theoretical method of spacecraft propulsion for interstellar travel. A fast moving spacecraft scoops up hydrogen from the interstellar medium using an enormous funnel-shaped magnetic field (ranging from kilometers to many thousands of kilometers in diameter); the hydrogen is compressed until thermonuclear fusion occurs, which provides thrust to counter the drag created by the funnel and energy to power the magnetic field. The Bussard ramjet can thus be seen as a ramjet variant of a fusion rocket.

The Bussard ramjet was proposed in 1960 by the physicist Robert W. Bussard.

The concept was popularized by Poul Anderson in his novel Tau Zero, Larry Niven in his Known Space series of books, Vernor Vinge in his Zones of Thought series, and Carl Sagan, as referenced in the television series and book Cosmos.

== Feasibility ==
Since the time of Bussard's original proposal, it has been discovered that the region surrounding the Solar System has a much lower density of hydrogen than was believed at that time (see Local Interstellar Cloud). In 1969, John Ford Fishback made an important contribution, describing the details of the required magnetic field.

In 1978, T. A. Heppenheimer analyzed Bussard's original suggestion of fusing protons, but found the Bremsstrahlung losses from compressing protons to fusion densities was greater than the power that could be produced by a factor of about 1 billion, thus indicating that the proposed version of the Bussard ramjet was infeasible. However, Daniel P. Whitmire's 1975 analysis indicates that a ramjet may achieve net power via the CNO cycle, which produces fusion at a much higher rate (~10^{16} times higher) than the proton–proton chain.

Robert Zubrin and Dana Andrews analyzed one hypothetical version of the Bussard ramjet design in 1988. They determined that their version of the ramjet would be unable to accelerate into the solar wind.

A 2021 study found that, while feasible in principle, the practical construction of a useful Bussard ramjet (of the Fishback's design) would require a funnel with a diameter of 4000 kilometers, and thus might be beyond even a civilization of Kardashev type II.

== Related inventions ==
=== Ram augmented interstellar rocket ===
The problem of using the interstellar medium as the sole fuel source led to study of the ram augmented interstellar rocket (RAIR). The RAIR carries its nuclear fuel supply and exhausts the reaction products to produce some of its thrust. However it greatly enhances its performance by scooping the interstellar medium and using this as extra reaction mass to augment the rocket. The propulsion system of the RAIR consists of three subsystems: a fusion reactor, a scoop field, and a plasma accelerator. Fuel is launched ahead of the ship with the accelerator. The scoop field funnels the fuel into another accelerator (this could for example be a heat exchange system transferring thermal energy from the reactor directly to the interstellar gas) which is supplied power from a reactor. One of the best ways to understand this concept is to consider that the hydrogen nuclear fuel carried on board acts as a fuel (energy source) whereas the interstellar gas collected by the scoop and then exhausted at great speed from the back acts as a propellant (the reaction mass), the vehicle therefore has a limited fuel supply but an unlimited propellant supply. A normal Bussard ramjet would have an infinite supply of both. However, theory suggests that where a Bussard ramjet would suffer drag from having to pre-accelerate interstellar gas to its own speed before intake, a RAIR system would be able to transfer energy via the "accelerator" mechanism to the interstellar medium despite velocity differences, and so would suffer far less drag.

=== Laser powered interstellar ramjet ===
Beamed energy coupled with a vehicle scooping hydrogen from the interstellar medium is another variant. A laser array in the solar system beams to a collector on a vehicle which uses something like a linear accelerator to produce thrust. This solves the fusion reactor problem for the ramjet. There are limitations because of the attenuation of beamed energy with distance.

=== Magnetic sail ===
The calculations (by Robert Zubrin and Dana Andrews) inspired the idea of a magnetic parachute or sail. This could be important for interstellar travel because it means that deceleration at the destination can be performed with a magnetic parachute rather than a rocket.

=== Dyson swarm-based stellar engine (Caplan thruster) ===
Astrophysicist Matthew E. Caplan of Illinois State University has proposed a type of stellar engine that uses a Dyson swarm of mirrors to concentrate stellar energy onto certain regions of a Sun-like star, producing beams of solar wind to be collected by a multi-ramjet assembly which in turn produces directed jets of plasma to stabilize its orbit and oxygen-14 to push the star. Using rudimentary calculations that assume maximum efficiency, Caplan estimates the Bussard engine would use 10^{15} grams per second of solar material to produce a maximum acceleration of 10^{−9} m/s^{2}, yielding a velocity of 200 km/s after 5 million years, and a distance of 10 parsecs over 1 million years. The Bussard engine would theoretically work for 100 million years given the mass loss rate of the Sun, but Caplan deems 10 million years to be sufficient for a stellar collision avoidance.

=== Pre-seeded trajectory ===
Several of the obvious technical difficulties with the Bussard ramjet can be overcome by setting out solid pellets of fuel along the spacecraft's trajectory in advance. This could be done using a different "tanker" spacecraft dropping fuel pellets or using laser propulsion. The method has been referred to as the "fusion runway", ramjet runway or "forward resupply runway".

While most proposals use fusion power, as with conventional Bussard ramjets, fission has also been suggested.

The advantages of this system include:

- Fusion can be achieved by slamming two fuel pellets together at a speed of at least 200 km/s - this is known as impact fusion. Compared to inertial confinement fusion, impact fusion would not require spherically symmetrical pellets or application of force from all directions.
- The fuel pellets could use isotopes such as deuterium (hydrogen-2) or tritium (hydrogen-3). A conventional Bussard ramjet will mostly collect protium (hydrogen-1), as this is the most abundant isotope of hydrogen in nature.
- Launching only ionized fusion fuel so that either magnetic or electrostatic scoops can more easily funnel the fuel into the engine. The drawback is this will cause the fuel to disperse due to electrostatic repulsion.
- Launching the fuel on a trajectory so that the fuel velocity vector will closely match the expected velocity vector of the spacecraft at that point in its trajectory. This will minimize the "drag" forces generated by the collection of fuel.
- Although the prelaunched fuel for the ramjet negates one advantage of the Bussard design (collection of fuel as it moves through the interstellar medium, saving the cost to launch the fuel mass), it at least retains the advantage of not having to accelerate the mass of the fuel and the mass of the rocket at the same time.
- The prelaunched fuel would provide some visibility into the interstellar medium – thus alerting the trailing spacecraft of unseen hazards (e.g., brown dwarfs).

The major disadvantages of this system include:

- The need to precisely intercept the fusion runway pellets with a spacecraft moving at high speed. Laser pulses could be used to guide the pellets.
- If using impact fusion, the spacecraft must be moving at a minimum speed in order to achieve fusion. One suggestion is for the spacecraft to use a Sun-skimming maneuver to reach 600 km/s.
- The spacecraft could not deviate from the precalculated trajectory unless it was critical to do so. Any such deviation would separate the spacecraft from its fuel supply and leave it with only a minimal ability to return to its original trajectory.
- Prelaunched fuel for deceleration at the destination star would not be available unless launched many decades in advance of the spacecraft launch. However, other systems (such as the magnetic sails) could be used for this purpose.

== See also ==
- Fusion rocket
- Ramjet

== Bibliography ==
- For more on ramjet math calculations see Mallove, Eugene F.; Matloff, Gregory L. (1989). The Star Flight Handbook. Wiley. ISBN 978-0-471-61912-3.
- Mallove, Eugene (1989). The Starflight Handbook. John Wiley & Sons, Inc. ISBN 978-0-471-61912-3.
- Matloff, Gregory (August 5, 2005). Deep Space Probes: To the Outer Solar System and Beyond. Springer Praxis Books. ISBN 978-3-540-24772-2.
- Anderson, Poul (2006). Tau Zero. Gollancz. ISBN 978-1-4072-3913-2.
