= Star lifting =

Hypothetical process of mining a star for resources

Star lifting is any of several hypothetical processes by which a sufficiently advanced civilization (specifically, one of Kardashev-II or higher) could remove a substantial portion of a star's matter which can then be re-purposed, while possibly optimizing the star's energy output and lifespan at the same time. The term appears to have been coined by David Criswell.

Stars already lose a small flow of mass via solar wind, coronal mass ejections, and other natural processes. Over the course of a star's life on the main sequence this loss is usually negligible compared to the star's total mass; only at the end of a star's life when it becomes a red giant or a supernova is a large proportion of material ejected. The star lifting techniques that have been proposed would operate by increasing this natural plasma flow and manipulating it with magnetic fields.

Stars have deep gravity wells, so the energy required for such operations is large. For example, lifting solar material from the surface of the Sun to the planet Mercury requires 1.6 × 10^{13} J/kg. This energy could be supplied by the star itself, collected by a Dyson sphere; using 10% of the Sun's total power output would allow 5.9 × 10^{21} kilograms of matter to be lifted per year (0.0000003% of the Sun's total mass), or 8% of the mass of Earth's moon.

== Methods for lifting material ==
=== Thermal-driven outflow ===
A mechanism for "harvesting" solar wind (RC = ring current, MN = magnetic nozzles, J = plasma jet)

The simplest system for star lifting would increase the rate of solar wind outflow by directly heating small regions of the star's atmosphere, using any of a number of different means to deliver energy such as microwave beams, lasers, or particle beams – whatever proved to be most efficient for the engineers of the system. This would produce a large and sustained eruption similar to a solar flare at the target location, feeding the solar wind.

The resulting outflow would be collected by using a ring current around the star's equator to generate a powerful toroidal magnetic field with its dipoles over the star's rotational poles. This would deflect the star's solar wind into a pair of jets aligned along its rotational axis passing through a pair of magnetic rocket nozzles. The magnetic nozzles would convert some of the plasma's thermal energy into outward velocity, helping cool the outflow. The ring current required to generate this magnetic field would be generated by a ring of particle accelerator space stations in close orbit around the star's equator. These accelerators would be physically separate from each other but would exchange two counterdirected beams of oppositely charged ions with their neighbor on each side, forming a complete circuit around the star.

=== "Huff-n-Puff" ===
David Criswell proposed a modification to the polar jet system in which the magnetic field could be used to increase solar wind outflow directly, without requiring additional heating of the star's surface. He dubbed it the "Huff-n-Puff" method, inspired from the Big Bad Wolf's threats in the fairy tale of Three Little Pigs.

In this system the ring of particle accelerators would not be in orbit, instead depending on the outward force of the magnetic field itself for support against the star's gravity. To inject energy into the star's atmosphere the ring current would first be temporarily shut down, allowing the particle accelerator stations to begin falling freely toward the star's surface. Once the stations had developed sufficient inward velocity the ring current would be reactivated and the resulting magnetic field would be used to reverse the stations' fall. This would "squeeze" the star, propelling stellar atmosphere through the polar magnetic nozzles. The ring current would be shut down again before the ring stations achieved enough outward velocity to throw them too far away from the star, and the star's gravity would be allowed to pull them back inward to repeat the cycle.

A single set of ring stations would result in a very intermittent flow. It is possible to smooth this flow out by using multiple sets of ring stations, with each set operating in a different stage of the Huff-n-Puff cycle at any given moment so that there is always one ring "squeezing". This would also smooth out the power requirements of the system over time.

=== Centrifugal acceleration ===
An alternative to the Huff-n-Puff method for using the toroidal magnetic field to increase solar wind outflow involves placing the ring stations in a polar orbit rather than an equatorial one. The two magnetic nozzles would then be located on the star's equator. To increase the rate of outflow through these two equatorial jets, the ring system would be rotated around the star at a rate significantly faster than the star's natural rotation. This would cause the stellar atmosphere swept up by the magnetic field to be flung outward.

This method suffers from a number of significant complications compared to the others. Rotating the ring in this manner would require the ring stations to use powerful rocket thrust, requiring both large rocket systems and a large amount of reaction mass. This reaction mass can be "recycled" by directing the rockets' exhausts so that it impacts the star's surface, but harvesting fresh reaction mass from the star's outflow and delivering it to the ring stations in sufficient quantity adds still more complexity to the system. Finally, the resulting jets would spiral outward from the star's equator rather than emerging straight from the poles; this could complicate harvesting it, as well as the arrangement of the Dyson sphere powering the system.

== Harvesting lifted mass ==
The material lifted from a star will emerge in the form of plasma jets hundreds or thousands of astronomical units long, primarily composed of hydrogen and helium and highly diffuse by current engineering standards. The details of extracting useful materials from this stream and storing the vast quantities that would result have not been extensively explored. One possible approach is to purify useful elements from the jets using extremely large-scale mass spectrometry, cool them by laser cooling, and condense them on particles of dust for collection. An alternative method could involve using large solenoids to slow the jets down and separate out the components. Electricity would also be generated via this system. Small artificial gas giant planets could be constructed from excess hydrogen and helium to store it for future use. Excess gas could also be used to build new earthlike planets to custom specifications.

In the case of the Solar System, one possible use for material harvested from the Sun would be to add it to Jupiter. Increasing Jupiter's mass about 100-fold would turn it into a star, allowing it to supply energy to its moons and also to the asteroid belt. However, this would have to be done carefully to avoid catastrophically changing the orbits of other bodies in the Solar System.

== Stellar husbandry ==
The lifespan of a star is determined by the size of its supply of nuclear "fuel" and the rate at which it uses up that fuel in fusion reactions in its core. Although larger stars have a larger supply of fuel, the increased core pressure resulting from that additional mass vastly increases the burn rate; thus large stars have a significantly shorter lifespan than small ones. Current theories of stellar dynamics also suggest that there is very little mixing between the bulk of a star's atmosphere and the material of its core, where fusion takes place, so most of a large star's fuel will never be used naturally. Small red dwarf stars, which are naturally fully convective, allow their core helium to mix with the outer layers of hydrogen which allows extremely long stellar lifespans on the order of trillions of years.

As a star's mass is reduced by star lifting its rate of nuclear fusion will decrease, reducing the amount of energy available to the star lifting process but also reducing the gravity that needs to be overcome. Theoretically, it would be possible to remove an arbitrarily large portion of a star's total mass given sufficient time. In this manner a civilization could control the rate at which its star uses fuel, optimizing the star's power output and lifespan to its needs. The hydrogen and helium extracted in the process could itself be utilized to fuel fusion reactors. Alternatively, the material could be assembled into additional smaller stars, to improve the efficiency of its use. Theoretically, most of the energy stored in the matter lifted from a star could be harvested if it is made into small black holes, via the mechanism of Hawking radiation.

== In fiction ==
- In the series Stargate Universe, the Ancient ship Destiny and the seed ships sent 2,000 years before Destiny are fueled by plasma from stars. The ship skims over the surface of a star just before dipping below the star's photosphere to scoop in plasma using its retractable collectors.
- In the Star Wars franchise of Knights of the Old Republic, the Star Forge is capable of star lifting. In a way, Starkiller Base in the seventh canonical film star lifts in order to power its planet-destroying laser cannon, although it consumes the entire star to do so.
- The novel Star Trek: Voyager – The Murdered Sun featured a reptilian race using the material from a star to sustain the opening of a wormhole. However, the novel depicted the process as shortening the star's lifespan precipitously rather than extending it.
- In The Night's Dawn Trilogy by Peter F. Hamilton, the alien species the Kiint created an arc of custom made planets around their sun from mass extracted from their star. Also, an alien race inhabiting massive "cities" orbiting a red giant, uses ships equipped with electromagnetic ramscoops as an alternative to planetary mining.
- In the Doctor Who episode "42" the crew of the starship Pentallian draw matter from a star to use as fuel for their ship.
- in the movie Star Wars: The Force Awakens, the First Order used a star to power their weapon Starkiller Base to destroy the New Republic’s capital Hosnian Prime, and the Resistance's base on D'Qar. Eventually, the Resistance launch an attack on Starkiller Base, allowing its destruction, as well as the star's energy, to create a new star named "Solo", in memory to Han Solo.
- In the novella Palimpsest by Charles Stross, the Stasis uses star lifting to replace the core of the Sun with a black hole, producing a "necrostar" with vastly expanded lifespan.
- In the novel The Time Ships by Stephen Baxter, the Morlocks create a Dyson sphere inside the orbit of Earth using matter lifted from the Sun.
- In the short story The Golden Apples of the Sun by Ray Bradbury, humans fly the rocket Copa de Oro to the Sun and dip a mechanical cup into it to capture the star's warmth for Earth.
- In the video game series Destiny, the mechanical race known as the Vex use star lifts to artificially extend the life of their Forge Star 2082 Volantis.
