= Cortical modem =

A cortical modem is a type of brain machine interface that specifically injects images directly into the visual cortex by way of a direct neural interface (DNI) chip. The true breakthrough goal lies in the information transfer speed. Both computers and the human brain can transfer information at incredible speeds, and the real bottleneck in the field of brain-computer interaction is the lack of data transfer speeds between the two.

This technology is especially useful in prosthetics. “If you can directly feed sensory information into the cortex – what the sensory system would have done if it was still there – then you would have the fine closed-loop input-output needed for complex control.” This technology can ultimately give back a person's sensory information that they lost, such as sight or touch.

== See also ==
- Windows Holographic
- Transhumanist
