= Halo drive =

Hypothetical spacecraft propulsion method

The halo drive is a hypothetical method of spacecraft propulsion proposed by David Kipping. It is named for the ring of light that would result from its operation.

== Operation ==
The momentum that is carried by light is capable of accelerating an object, even to relativistic speeds. A spacecraft using a halo drive would emit a stream of photons that would come within proximity of a black hole that is in motion towards the spacecraft that is operating a halo drive. These photons would travel along a boomerang null geodesic, a path which does not allow the photons to fall into the photon sphere, since then they would simply fall into orbit around the black hole. The path that the photons take comes close to, but does not cross into, the photon sphere.

As the photons travel around the black hole, they would gain kinetic energy from it. The geodesic that these photons travel on would lead back to the spacecraft, imparting the gained kinetic energy upon a solar sail, causing acceleration. If the halo drive is used in the opposite direction, the same concepts can be applied to decelerate a spacecraft.

Afterwards, the photons would be re-emitted, going through the process again, allowing the spacecraft to gain more kinetic energy. The energy gained would be capable of accelerating a spacecraft to relativistic speeds. A spacecraft using the halo drive would be capable of accelerating to 133% of the speed of the black hole. This is true regardless of the mass of the spacecraft, so long as it is significantly less than the mass of the black hole. This means that the acceleration of very large spacecraft to relativistic speeds becomes feasible.

The spacecraft employing the halo drive is not required to carry fuel, as the photons can be provided from another source. If the spacecraft is not carrying fuel, the halo drive would carry the benefit of reducing the mass of the spacecraft, allowing it to be much more easily accelerated.

It is similar in concept to a gravitational assist, though it differs in that a spacecraft employing a halo drive would not physically be travelling around a black hole. This prevents any damage from befalling the spacecraft due to the extreme gravitational effects present in that environment.

== Issues ==
The absorption of photons must be efficient in order for the halo drive to accelerate the spacecraft; the energy transferred to the craft must be larger than the losses incurred when the photons are recycled.

The halo drive must be able to give the spacecraft enough energy to escape the system.

There also cannot be a significant concentration of material that could obfuscate the beam. For example, an accretion disk would cause the beam emitted by the halo drive to lose energy due to the beam being blocked. This means that the halo drive would not function well when used with a black hole that has an accretion disk.

== Relevance to Spotting Other Civilizations ==
In operating a halo drive, the photons take energy away from the black hole binary, causing the orbit to become more eccentric. This would cause the system to become unstable. If black hole mergers occur more often than would be typically expected, then it could be a sign of another civilization using a halo drive.
