= Globus Cassus =

Art project and book by Christian Waldvogel

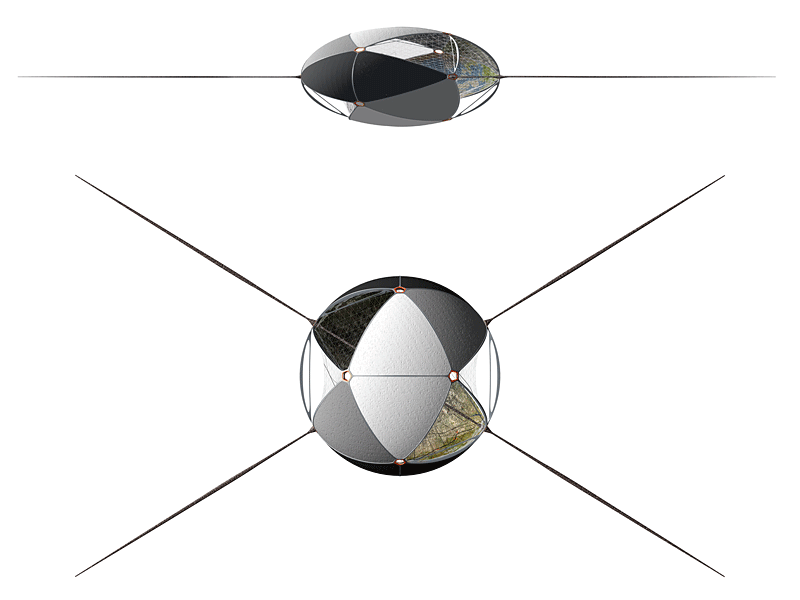
Top and side view of the Globus Cassus

Globus Cassus is an art project and book by Swiss architect and artist Christian Waldvogel presenting a conceptual transformation of Earth into a much bigger, hollow, artificial world with an ecosphere on its inner surface. It was the Swiss contribution to the 2004 Venice Architecture Biennale, and the book was awarded the gold medal in the category "Most beautiful books of the World" at the Leipzig Book Fair in 2005. It consists of a meticulous description of the transformation process, a narrative of its construction, and suggestions on the organizational workings on Globus Cassus.

Waldvogel described it as an "open source" art project and stated that anyone could contribute designs and narratives to it on the project wiki. As of August 2012, the Globus Cassus wiki is no longer operational.

== Properties ==
Comparison to Earth
	Globus Cassus	Earth
Diameter	85,000 km	15%
Diameter with cables	318,000 km	—
Diameter of Moon's orbit	768,000 km	equal
Total mass	5.973×10^{24} kg	equal
Water mass	1.35×10^{18} kg	equal
Average depth of sea	3250 m	3960 m
Atmosphere	5.1×10^{18} kg	equal
Average (structural) density	827 kg/m^{3}	667%
Total (inner) surface area	9.620 billion km^{2}	2.22%
Covered with water	7.223×10^{8} km^{2}	47%
Habitable area	5.413×10^{8} km^{2}	11.11%

The proposed megastructure would incorporate all of Earth's matter. Sunlight would enter through two large windows, and gravity would be simulated by the centrifugal effect. Humans would live on two vast regions that face each other and that are connected through the empty center. The hydrosphere and atmosphere would be retained on its inside. The ecosphere would be restricted to the equatorial zones, while at the low-gravity tropic zones a thin atmosphere would allow only for plantations. The polar regions would have neither gravity nor atmosphere and would therefore be used for storage of raw materials and microgravity production processes.

=== Geometric structure ===
Globus Cassus has the form of a compressed geodesic icosahedron with two diagonal openings. Along the edges of the icosahedron run the beams that form the skeleton of the shape, the gaps between the beams contain a shell, and, where there are windows, inward-curving domes.

=== Building material ===
The Earth's crust, mantle and core would be gradually excavated, transported outwards and then transformed to larger strength and reduced density. While the crust is mined from open pits in the continents' centers, magma and the liquid mantle are pumped across transfer hoses. The core would be dismantled from the surface.

=== Planetary scale ===
Since the stationary cables would stay clear inside the moon's trajectory, the construction of Globus Cassus would not alter the Earth-Moon system. However, on a planetary scale the proportions would be altered, with Globus Cassus being only slightly smaller than Saturn, the Solar System's second-largest planet.

== Construction process ==
Starting at four precisely defined points in the geostationary orbit, four space elevators are built. Eventually, they will become massive towers, each measuring several hundred kilometers in diameter and extending to a length of about 165,000 km. The towers contain elevators which are used to transport silicate building material to the construction sites at geostationary orbit.

=== Skeleton and shell ===
The building material would be converted into vacuum-porous aggregate and used to form the skeleton. It would be built retaining constant symmetry and balance at every moment and will ultimately span around all sides of the earth. Then magma would be pumped towards the skeleton, where it would be used to form thin shells in the skeletal openings. Eight of these openings are fitted with large, inward-curving window domes made out of silicon glass.

=== The Great Rains ===
Having been used up to a large degree, the Earth has shrunk, the polar ice caps have melted and the Earth's mass and therefore gravity has declined. This leads to the sudden loss of the atmosphere and hydrosphere, which wander outwards towards the new World. Globus Cassus' equator zones are equipped with a system of trenches and moulds that will become rivers, lakes and seas as soon as the water has settled. The transfer process of atmosphere and hydrosphere is called "The Great Rains".

=== Colonization ===
The moment the Great Rains start, the Earth becomes uninhabitable. Along with massive amounts of seed for all existing plants, the regions of high cultural value, that need to be conserved and reapplied on Globus Cassus have been stored in the skeleton nodes which touch the towers. Humans and animals rise in the towers to await the end of the rains and start settling on the two equator regions.

=== Plant growth ===
The remaining Earth core would be dismantled to build the shells that lie in the pole regions. During this process, the massive heat radiation of the core accelerates plant growth and therefore aids the process of establishing a functioning biosphere.

== Literature ==
Book cover

- Globus Cassus, Lars Müller Publishers, with contributions by Boris Groys, Claude Lichtenstein, Michael Stauffer and Christian Waldvogel. Awarded the gold medal in international competition "Best designed books from all over the World 2004", (ISBN 3-03778-045-2)

== See also ==
- Bernal sphere – Long-term space habitat proposal
- Dyson sphere – Hypothetical megastructure around a star
- Planetary engineering – Influencing a planet's global environments
- Planetary habitability – Known extent to which a planet is suitable for life
- Terraforming – Hypothetical planetary engineering process
- Rendezvous with Rama – 1973 science fiction novel by Arthur C. Clarke
