= Diamond tree =

Diamond trees (tropostats) are a theoretical product of a future technology in molecular manufacturing that have been proposed as a method of long-term sequestration of atmospheric carbon into solid diamond products. There is growing interest in the conversion of sequestered atmospheric carbon dioxide into synthetic diamond, a process pioneered by a New York based company called Aether Diamonds. So far, the only method used for creating synthetic diamonds from carbon dioxide sequestered from the atmosphere is by chemical vapour deposition.
