= Nano electrokinetic thruster =

Theoretical space propulsion system

The Nano electrokinetic thruster is a theoretical space propulsion system based on the principle of electro-osmosis (also electroosmotic flow). It allows for a high specific impulse and high thrust-to-power ratio as well as a high final velocity which makes it suitable for a wide variety of applications. Due to difficulties in the production of the needed carbon nanotubes experimental testing has not yet started.

== Description ==
The principle of electro-osmosis or electroosmotic flow creates a flow of an electrolyte through a very small tube in the nano-meter range. To achieve this flow there is a cathode and an anode at the ends of the tube over which a voltage is applied. Due to this voltage the ions in the electrolyte stored in a reservoir directly connected to the tube can be accelerated and ejected. This way electrical energy is transformed into kinetic energy. The amount of thrust created by one nano thruster is in the micro newton range, however due to its size it makes sense to arrange a large number in an array to achieve sufficient thrust. The thrust, exit velocity of the ions and the mass flow rate of the electrolyte are influenced by the applied voltage which makes it easy to regulate those parameters. The applied voltage and the pH-value of the electrolyte (amount of ions it contains) also vary the balance between thrust, efficiency and maximal exhaust velocity (determines the maximal achievable flight velocity). It is also theoretically possible to achieve a very high efficiency of nearly 100% as well as a high specific impulse and high thrust-to-power ratio. This system has not yet been built and experimentally tested because of difficulties with the production of the nano-tubes needed for it.

== Advantages ==
Nano electrokinetic thrusters have a very high efficiency, specific impulse, exhaust velocity and thrust-to-power ratio which make them suitable for a wide variety of applications. Due to the fact that a thruster is made up out of an array of multiple nano thrusters it is easily possible to design thrusters in all sizes and thrust ranges. These properties give the nano electrokinetic thrusters very good thrust control which makes it applicable for a wide range of spacecraft ranging from maneuvering thrusters for small spacecraft, such as satellites, to the primary propulsion system of interplanetary or interstellar spacecraft. This system also doesn't require additional heat or radiation shielding to protect the rest of the space craft which make the system (not including fuel compartment) light in comparison to other designs.

== Disadvantages ==
The production of the required carbon nano tubes is very expensive and with current production methods the amount of surface defects in the produced carbon nano tubes is high which reduces the efficiency significantly and makes it unreliable. This design also requires a high potential difference in the range of 300 to 500 volts as well as a sufficient storage tank for the liquid electrolyte needed which increase the weight of the overall system.
