= Chrysler TV-8 =

- Concept design of the Chrysler TV-8
- Type: amphibious medium tank

Production history
- Designer: Chrysler
- Designed: 1955
- Manufacturer: Chrysler

Specifications
- Mass: 25 tonnes (25 long tons; 28 short tons)
- Length: 8.94 metres (29 feet 4 inches)
- Width: 3.40 metres (11 feet 2 inches)
- Height: 2.92 metres (9 feet 7 inches) (over the remote-controlled machine gun)
- Crew: 4
- Armor: spaced armor
- Main armament: 90mm T208 smoothbore gun
- Secondary armament: two coaxial 7.62 mm machine guns and one remote-controlled 12.7 mm heavy machine gun
- Engine: Chrysler V-8 petrol engine and two electric motors 300 horsepower (220 kW)
- Power/weight: 12 hp/t
- Transmission: electric

The Chrysler TV-8 was a tank design project by Chrysler in the 1950s. The tank was intended to be a medium tank capable of land and amphibious warfare. The design was never produced.

== Description ==
The TV-8 was presented in a proposal by Chrysler Corporation subsequent to the Astron "X-weapon" project. Using an unconventional tank design, the proposed tank located the entire crew, engine and ammunition storage within a pod-shaped turret mounted above a lightweight chassis which could be separated for air shipment. The total weight of the tank was approximately 25 tons, with the turret weighing 15 tons and the chassis weighing 10 tons.

Following review, it was concluded that the TV-8 design did not prove to have significant advantages over conventional tank design to warrant further development, and on 23 April 1956, the TV-8 and three ASTRON proposals were effectively terminated.

=== Mobility ===
The phase I design of the Chrysler TV-8 featured a Chrysler V-8 engine with 300 gross horsepower which was coupled to an electric generator located within the rear turret; the generator powered two electric motors in the front hull, each motor driving either of the two 28-inch wide tracks. Propulsion in the water was by means of a water jet pump installed in the bottom rear of the turret.

Other methods of powering the tank that were later considered include a gas turbine engine drive, a vapour-cycle power plant fueled by hydrocarbons, and a nuclear fission-powered vapour-cycle power plant.

=== Armament ===
The tank was armed with a 90mm T208 smoothbore gun with a hydraulic ramming device mounted in the turret, with ammunition stored in the rear turret behind a steel bulkhead separating from the crew. Two coaxial .30 calibre machine guns and one remote-controlled .50 calibre machine gun on top of the turret were also included.

=== Protection ===
The heavily armored inner turret was surrounded by a light outer shell that gave the turret its podlike appearance. This outer shell was watertight creating sufficient displacement to allow the vehicle to float. The outer turret shell was of sufficient thickness to detonate shaped charge rounds and it acted as spaced armor to help protect the inner turret.

Closed-circuit television was implemented as a measure to protect crew from the flash of tactical nuclear explosions and improve field of vision. The fuel tanks for the phase I vehicle, powered by a Chrysler V8 engine, were located in the hull separating them from the crew in the turret.

== In pop culture ==
In episode 5 of the TV show Loki, titled "Journey into Mystery", a rusting Chrysler TV-8 can be spotted multiple times.

== Bibliography ==
- Hunnicutt, RP (1990). A History of the American Main Battle Tank, Volume 2: Abrams. United States: Presidio. ISBN 9780891413882.
