= Aurora (supercomputer) =

US DOE supercomputer by Intel and Cray

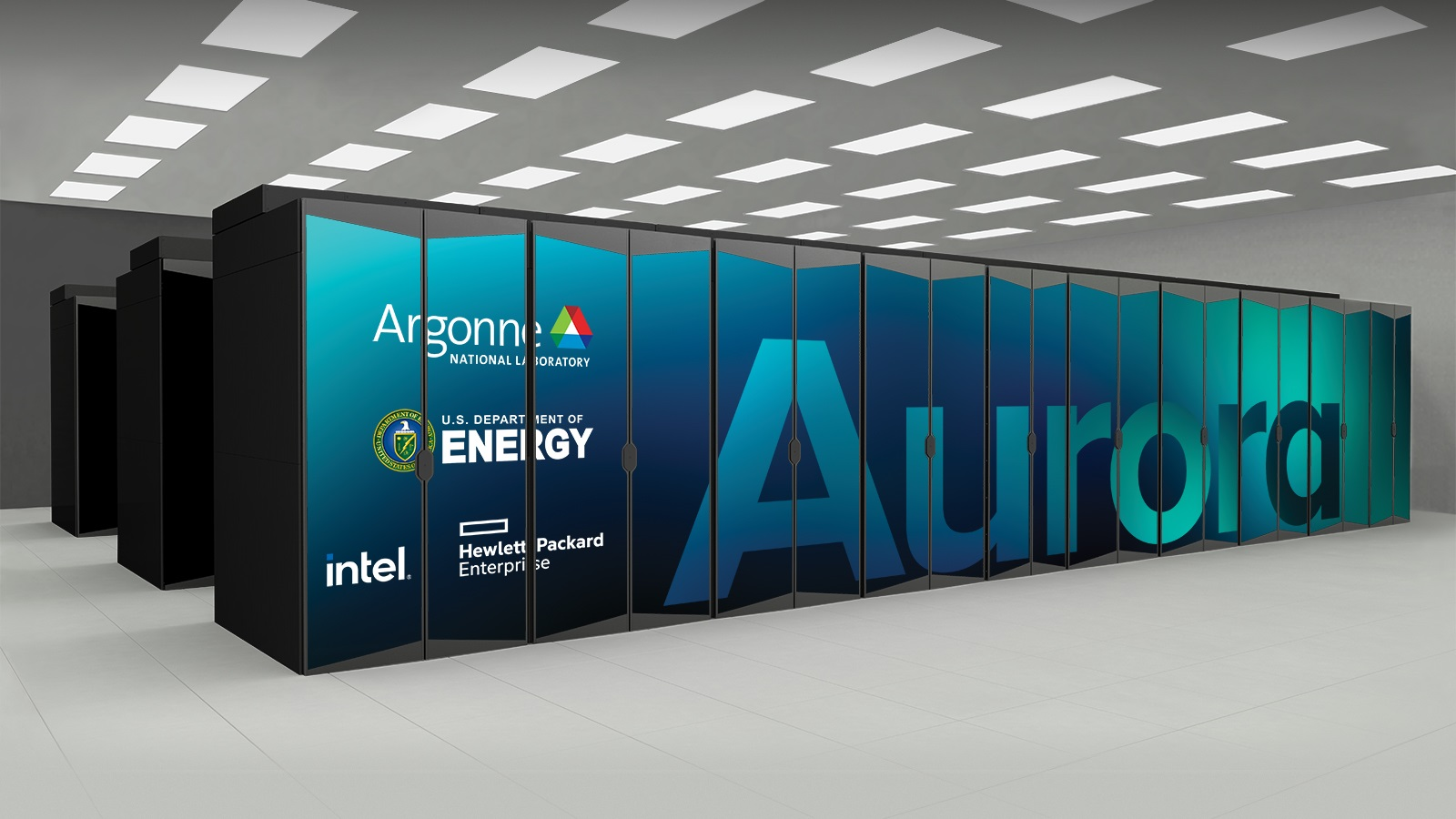
- Active: Deployment: Nov, 2023
- Operators: Argonne National Laboratory and U.S. Department of Energy
- Location: Argonne Leadership Computing Facility
- Power: 38.7 MW
- Speed: 1.012 exaFLOPS (Rmax) / 1.98 exaFLOPS (Rpeak)
- Cost: US$500 million (est.)
- Ranking: TOP500: 4, June 2026
- Purpose: Scientific research and development
- Website: www.anl.gov/aurora

Aurora is an exascale supercomputer that was sponsored by the United States Department of Energy (DOE) and designed by Intel and Cray for Argonne National Laboratory. It was briefly the second fastest supercomputer in the world from November 2023 to June 2024.

The cost was estimated in 2019 to be US$500 million. Olivier Franza is the chief architect and principal investigator of this design.

== History ==
In 2013 DOE presented a proposal for an "exascale" supercomputer, capable of speeds in the neighborhood of 1 exaFLOP (10^{18} floating point mathematical operations per second) with a maximum power consumption of 20 megawatts (MW) by 2020. Aurora was first announced in 2015 and to be finished in 2018. It was expected to have a speed of 180 petaFLOPS which would be around the speed of Summit. Aurora was meant to be the most powerful supercomputer at the time of its launch and to be built by Cray with Intel processors. Later, in 2017, Intel announced that Aurora would be delayed to 2021 but scaled up to 1 exaFLOP. In March 2019, DOE said that it would build the first supercomputer with a performance of one exaFLOP in the United States in 2021.

In October 2020, DOE said that Aurora would be delayed again for a further six months, and would no longer be the first exascale computer in the US. In late October 2021 Intel announced that Aurora would now exceed 2 exaFLOPS in peak double-precision compute – That claim however never was realized. The system was fully installed on June 22, 2023.

In May 2024, Aurora appeared at number two on the Top500 supercomputer list, with a performance of 1.012 exaFLOPS, marking the second entry of an exascale capable system on the Top500.

== Usage ==
Functions include research on brain structure, nuclear fusion, low carbon technologies, subatomic particles, cancer and cosmology. It will also develop new materials that will be useful for batteries and more efficient solar cells. It is to be available to the general scientific community.

== Architecture ==
Aurora has 10,624 nodes, with each node being composed of two Intel Xeon Max processors, six Intel Max series GPUs and a unified memory architecture, providing a maximum computing power of 130 teraFLOPS per node. It has around 10 petabytes of memory and 230 petabytes of storage.

The machine is stated to consume around 39 MW of power. For comparison, the fastest computer in the world today, El Capitan uses 30 MW, while another Top 500 System, Frontier uses 24 MW.

== See also ==
- ARM supercomputers
- Colossus (supercomputer)
- El Capitan (supercomputer)
- Fugaku (supercomputer)
- List of fastest computers
- List of the top supercomputers in the United States
- TOP500
