= Planetary engineering =

Influencing a planet's global environments

Planetary engineering is the development and application of technology for the purpose of influencing the environment of a planet. Planetary engineering encompasses a variety of methods such as terraforming, seeding, and geoengineering.

Widely discussed in the scientific community, terraforming refers to the alteration of other planets to create a habitable environment for terrestrial life. Seeding refers to the introduction of life from Earth to habitable planets. Geoengineering refers to the engineering of a planet's climate, and has already been applied on Earth. Each of these methods are composed of varying approaches and possess differing levels of feasibility and ethical concern.

== Historical Context ==
The idea of humans altering other planet environments dates back before the term terraforming was created. In the early 20th century, there was a period for rapid scientific discovery which included planetary atmospheres. Astronomer Percival Lowell popularized the idea that Mars may have canals which sparked debate on whether Mars had the potential to house life. Most of Lowell's work was later proven incorrect but it got people thinking about altering planets.

By the 1940s and 1950s, the idea for planetary engineering started to appear in works of science fiction. Writers started discussing and exploring humans, changing environments of other planets to make them habitable. They often included ideas for changing entire ecosystems for humans to live on. These fictional explorations reflected humans desire to control the nature they lived in. Humans on earth have often changed their environments to help survive. This can be anywhere from agriculture to large scale infrastructure.

Astrophysicist Carl Sagan first proposed the scientific idea back in a 1961 Science Paper discussing the topic of terraforming the atmosphere of Venus with algae to reduce carbon dioxide and temperatures. This became one of the first times where a leading scientist discussed the idea publicly of altering a planet's environment. Over the next few decades, the idea of planetary engineering changed from just science fiction to more of a scientific discussion, as space exploration advanced. In the 1970s, the space race accelerated and the first made satellites and probes were being made. These groundbreaking satellites and probes were sent out into space to return data from that helped us understand the Moons and Earths ecosystem better.

At the same time geoengineering on earth became widely talked about topics for concerns of industrial pollution, ozone depletion, and global warming. Scientists began to discuss large scale strategies we could combat these changes in earth atmosphere which included stratospheric aerosol injection.

Around the 1980s, the development of modern computing and data collection helped further advance the thinking of planetary engineering. Agencies started to collaborate to build a model of weather patterns on a global scale. Later this helped us to really understand climate change, and this shifted focus of managing just local and regional climates to managing weather on a planetary scale. By the 2000s, geoengineering became the more widely used term for climate intervention. These include strategies like solar radiation management (SRM). Solar radiation management was used to reflect sunlight to slow climate change. The effects would vary based on timing, magnitude, and the type of radiation. They soon installed temporary, moderate, and responsive scenarios. These would be used to monitor the effects of solar radiation management as to not have unexpected consequences like ozone depletion.

== Terraforming ==
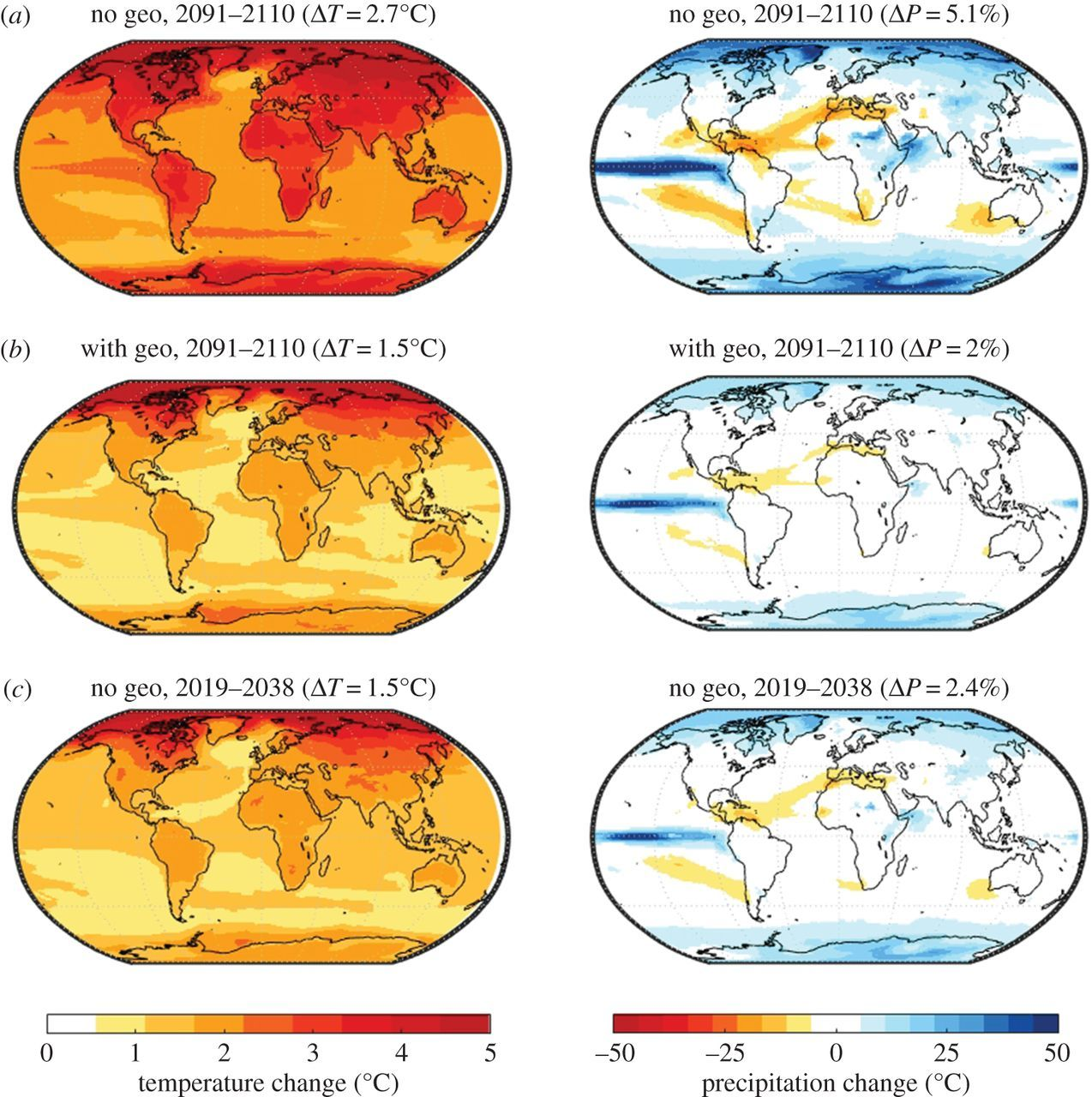
Projected temperature and precipitation changes relative to preindustrial; end-of-century response without (a) and with (b) geoengineering to avoid temperature rise above 1.5C.

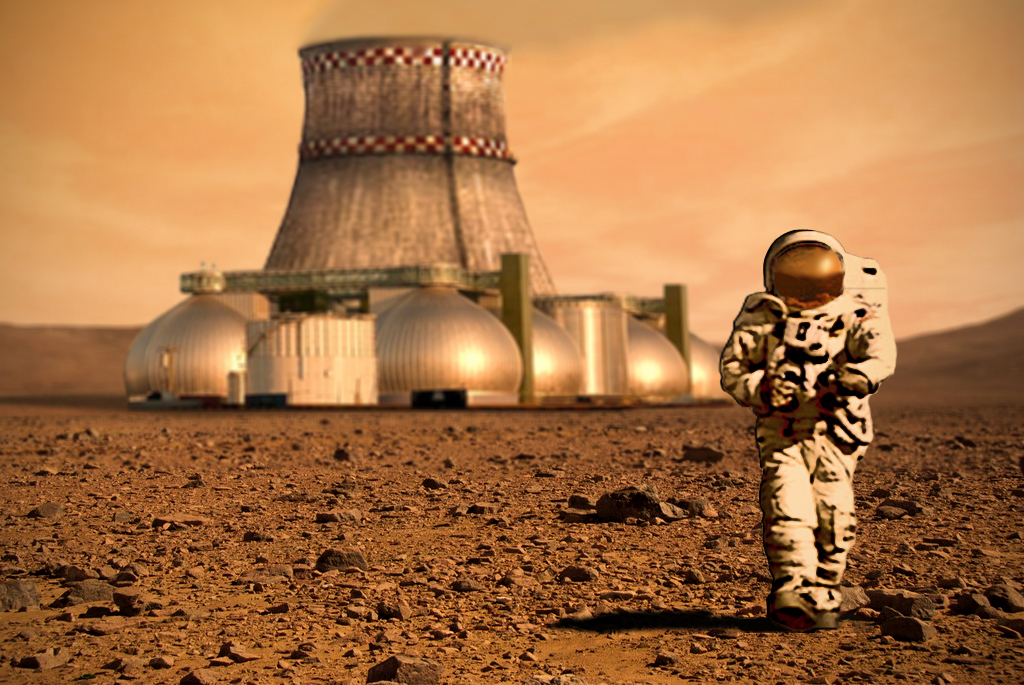
A theoretical design for a power station on Mars. Terraforming designs are not yet planned.

Terraforming is the process of modifying the atmosphere, temperature, surface topography or ecology of a planet, moon, or other body in order to replicate the environment of Earth.

=== Technologies ===
A common object of discussion on potential terraforming is the planet Mars. To terraform Mars, humans would need to create a new atmosphere, due to the planet's high carbon dioxide concentration and low atmospheric pressure. This would be possible by introducing more greenhouse gases to below "freezing point from indigenous materials". To terraform Venus, carbon dioxide would need to be converted to graphite since Venus receives twice as much sunlight as Earth. This process is only possible if the greenhouse effect is removed with the use of "high-altitude absorbing fine particles" or a sun shield, creating a more habitable Venus.

NASA has defined categories of habitability systems and technologies for terraforming to be feasible. These topics include creating power-efficient systems for preserving and packaging food for crews, preparing and cooking foods, dispensing water, and developing facilities for rest, trash and recycling, and areas for crew hygiene and rest.

=== Feasibility ===
A variety of planetary engineering challenges stand in the way of terraforming efforts. The atmospheric terraforming of Mars, for example, would require "significant quantities of gas" to be added to the Martian atmosphere. This gas has been thought to be stored in solid and liquid form within Mars' polar ice caps and underground reservoirs. It is unlikely, however, that enough CO_{2} for sufficient atmospheric change is present within Mars' polar deposits, and liquid CO_{2} could only be present at warmer temperatures "deep within the crust". Furthermore, sublimating the entire volume of Mars' polar caps would increase its current atmospheric pressure to 15 millibar, where an increase to around 1000 millibar would be required for habitability. For reference, Earth's average sea-level pressure is 1013.25 mbar.

First formally proposed by astrophysicist Carl Sagan, the terraforming of Venus has since been discussed through methods such as organic molecule-induced carbon conversion, sun reflection, increasing planetary spin, and various chemical means. Due to the high presence of sulfuric acid and solar wind on Venus, which are harmful to organic environments, organic methods of carbon conversion have been found unfeasible. Other methods, such as solar shading, hydrogen bombardment, and magnesium-calcium bombardment are theoretically sound but would require large-scale resources and space technologies not yet available to humans.

== Habitability ==
In planetary engineering, the term habitability is used to describe if a planet has the ability to support life and what the conditions are to make that possible. Scientists distinguish between two types of habitably, short-term and long-term. Short-term refers to an organism's ability to survive on a planet from anywhere to a few days to a few years. Long-term refers to an organism's ability to sustain itself on a planet for multiple decades.

A habitat is described as an environment that supports the activities of at least one known organism. This can mean different things:

- Survival means the organism can stay alive and repair damage by using resources provided by the environment.
- Maintenance means that the organism can continue normal cell activities but not reproduce.
- Growth means the organism is able get larger.
- Reproduction means the organism can multiply or create the next generation.Habitability is important in the field of planetary engineering because it is what most engineers and scientists aim to create when talking about modifying another planet's ecosystem or environment. Understanding habitability helps to guide the engineering strategies used like temperature management and resource distribution.

== Ethical considerations ==
While successful terraforming would allow life to prosper on other planets, philosophers have debated whether this practice is morally sound. Certain ethics experts suggest that planets like Mars hold an intrinsic value independent of their utility to humanity and should therefore be free from human interference. Also, some argue that through the steps that are necessary to make Mars habitable - such as fusion reactors, space-based solar-powered lasers, or spreading a thin layer of soot on Mars' polar ice caps - would deteriorate the current aesthetic value that Mars possesses. This calls into question humanity's intrinsic ethical and moral values, as it raises the question of whether humanity is willing to eradicate the current ecosystem of another planet for their benefit. Through this ethical framework, terraforming attempts on these planets could be seen to threaten their intrinsically valuable environments, rendering these efforts unethical.

Another important ethical consideration for terraforming is the way some humans believe it is their role in our universe. The media also influences how we perceive terraforming. As the media often shows, terraforming is an exciting step or even a necessary step for the survival of humans. In many TV shows and movies space colonization is portrayed as spectacular with pretty images to encourage support from the public. This sparks many debates between philosophers. For example, Paul York suggests that if humans ever have the need to terraform another planets surface because Earths is so deteriorated, then terraforming a different planets surface like Mars could lead to a similar destruction. On the other hand, James Schwartz and other environmental philosophers argue that if we explore and terraform other planets that this could lead to an understanding and solve some environmental problems we face on Earth.

== Seeding ==
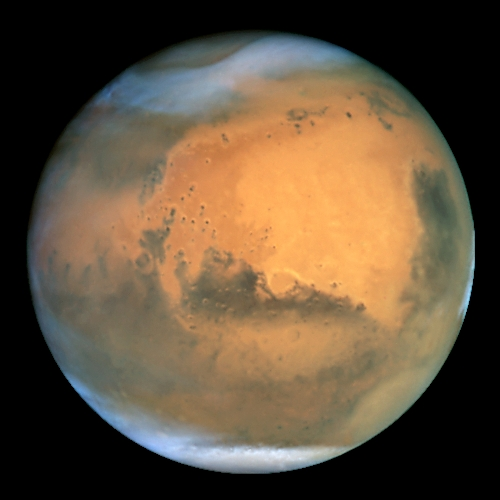
NASA's Hubble Space Telescope took the picture of Mars on June 26, 2001, when Mars was approximately 68 million kilometers (43 million miles) from Earth — the closest Mars has ever been to Earth since 1988. Hubble can see details as small as 16 kilometers (10 miles) across. The colors have been carefully balanced to give a realistic view of Mars' hues as they might appear through a telescope. Especially striking is the large amount of seasonal dust storm activity seen in this image. One large storm system is churning high above the northern polar cap (top of image), and a smaller dust storm cloud can be seen nearby. Another large dust storm is spilling out of the giant Hellas impact basin in the Southern Hemisphere (lower right) exploration.

=== Environmental considerations ===
Mars is the primary subject of discussion for seeding. Locations for seeding are chosen based on atmospheric temperature, air pressure, existence of harmful radiation, and availability of natural resources, such as water and other compounds essential to terrestrial life.

=== Developing microorganisms for seeding ===
Natural or engineered microorganisms must be created or discovered that can withstand the harsh environments of Mars. The first organisms used must be able to survive exposure to ionizing radiation and the high concentration of CO_{2} present in the Martian atmosphere. Later organisms such as multicellular plants must be able to withstand the freezing temperatures, withstand high CO_{2} levels, and produce significant amounts of O_{2}.

Microorganisms provide significant advantages over non-biological mechanisms. They are self-replicating, negating the needs to either transport or manufacture large machinery to the surface of Mars. They can also perform complicated chemical reactions with little maintenance to realize planet-scale terraforming.

== Climate engineering ==
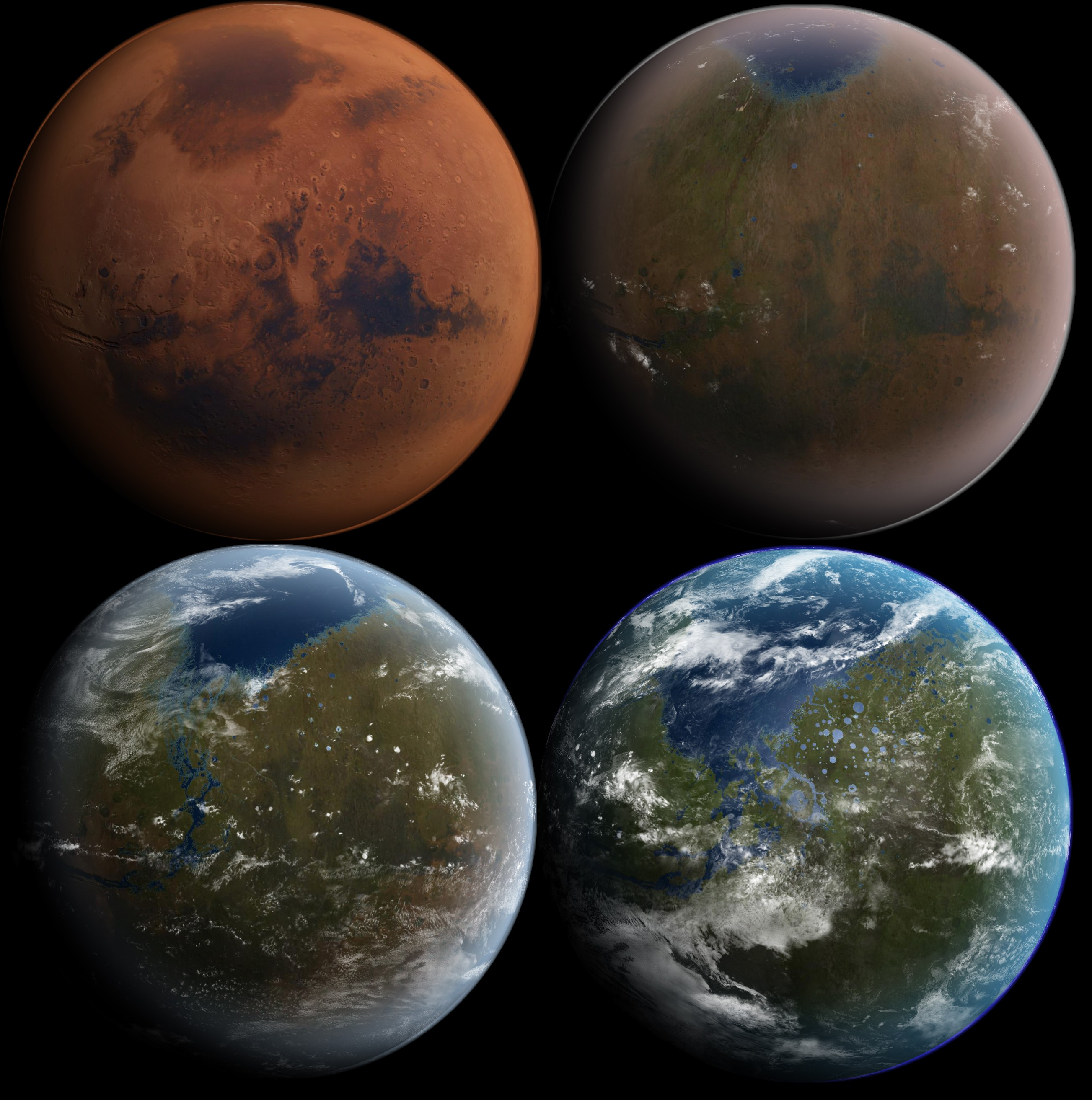
Impression of the hypothetical phrases of the terraforming of Mars

Climate engineering is a form of planetary engineering which involves the process of deliberate and large-scale alteration of the Earth's climate system to combat climate change. Examples of geoengineering are carbon dioxide removal (CDR), which removes carbon dioxide from the atmosphere, and solar radiation modification (SRM) to reflect solar energy to space. Carbon dioxide removal (CDR) has multiple practices, the simplest being reforestation, to more complex processes such as direct air capture. The latter is rather difficult to deploy on an industrial scale, for high costs and substantial energy usage would be some aspects to address.

Examples of SRM include stratospheric aerosol injection (SAI) and marine cloud brightening (MCB). When a volcano erupts, small particles known as aerosols proliferate throughout the atmosphere, reflecting the sun's energy back into space. This results in a cooling effect, and humanity could conceivably inject these aerosols into the stratosphere, spurring large-scale cooling.

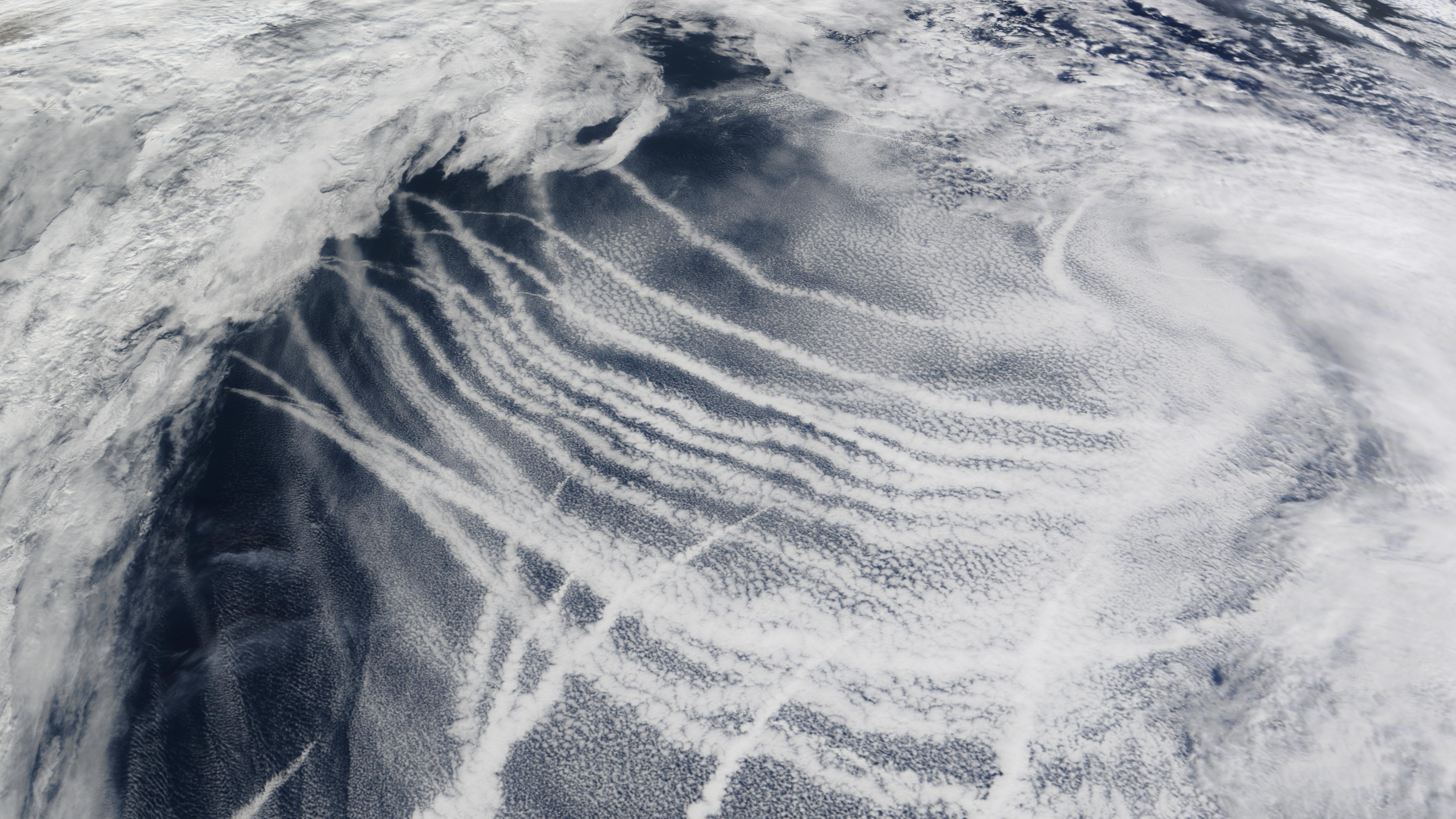
Visible ship tracks in the Northern Pacific, on 4 March 2009. On an overcast day, the clouds look uniform. However, NASA MODIS images' sensor reveals long, skinny trails of brighter clouds hidden within. As ships travel across the ocean, pollution in the ships' exhaust create more cloud drops that are smaller in size, resulting in even brighter clouds.

One proposal for MCB involves spraying a vapor into low-laying sea clouds, creating more cloud condensation nuclei. This would in theory result in the cloud becoming whiter, and reflecting light more efficiently.

== See also ==
- Astroengineering
- Macro-engineering
- Megascale engineering
- Moving the Earth
- Virgin Earth Challenge
