= Dyson sphere =

Hypothetical megastructure around a star

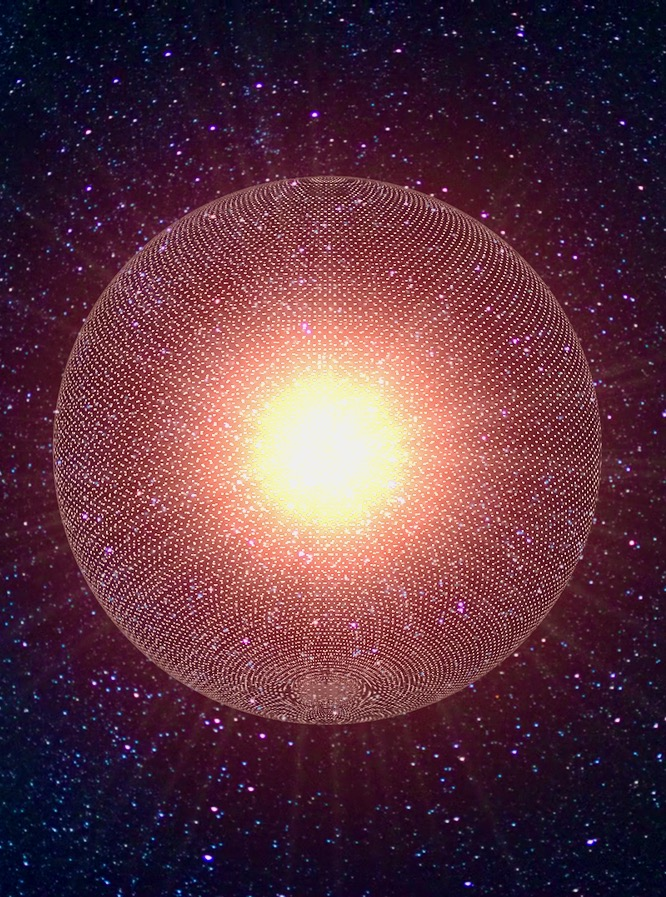
A depiction of a hypothetical Dyson swarm surrounding a star

A Dyson sphere is a hypothetical megastructure that encompasses a star and captures a large percentage of its power output. The concept is a thought experiment that attempts to imagine how a spacefaring civilization would meet its energy requirements once those requirements exceed what can be generated from the home planet's resources alone. Because only a tiny fraction of a star's energy emissions reaches the surface of any orbiting planet, building structures encircling a star would enable a civilization to harvest far more energy.

The earliest modern imagining of such a structure was by Olaf Stapledon in his science fiction novel Star Maker (1937). The same concept was later used by physicist Freeman Dyson in his 1960 paper "Search for Artificial Stellar Sources of Infrared Radiation". Dyson speculated that such structures would be the logical consequence of the escalating energy needs of a technological civilization and would be a necessity for its long-term survival. A signature of such spheres detected in astronomical searches would be an indicator of extraterrestrial intelligence.

Since Dyson's paper, many variant designs involving an artificial structure or series of structures to encompass a star have been proposed in exploratory engineering or described in science fiction, often under the name "Dyson sphere". Fictional depictions often describe a solid shell of matter enclosing a star – an arrangement Dyson himself considered impossible. The sphere he imagined consisted of a loose collection or swarm of objects traveling on independent orbits around the star, an arrangement that has become known as a Dyson swarm.

== Origins ==
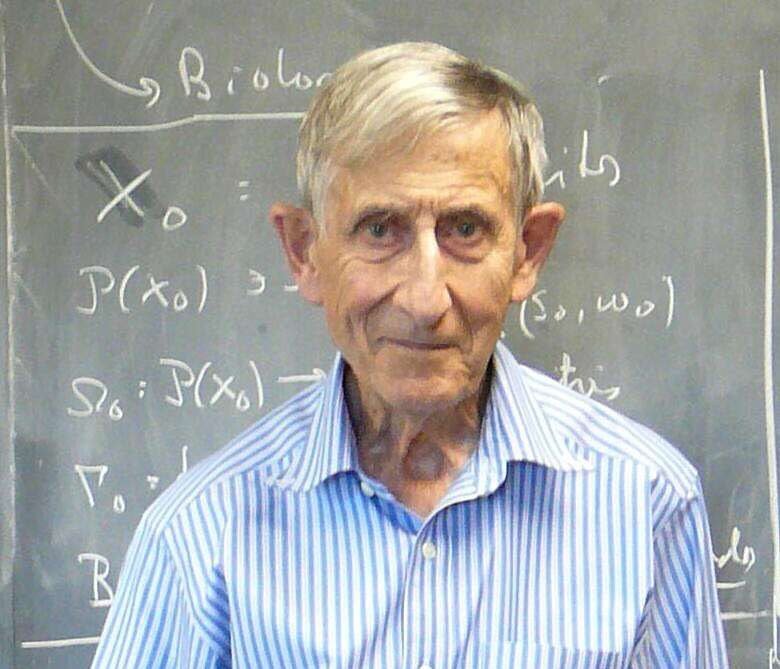
Freeman Dyson, who explored the concept from a scientific perspective

Inspired by the 1937 science fiction novel Star Maker by Olaf Stapledon, the physicist and mathematician Freeman Dyson was the first to formalize the concept of what became known as the "Dyson sphere" in his 1960 Science paper "Search for Artificial Stellar Sources of Infra-Red Radiation". Dyson theorized that as the energy requirements of an advanced technological civilization increased, there would come a time when it would need to systematically harvest the energy from its local star on a large scale. He speculated that this could be done via a system of structures orbiting the star, designed to intercept and collect its energy. He argued that as the structure would result in the large-scale conversion of starlight into far-infrared radiation, an earth-based search for sources of infrared radiation could identify stars supporting intelligent life.

Dyson did not detail how such a system could be constructed, simply referring to it in the paper as a "shell" or "biosphere". He later clarified that he did not have in mind a solid structure, saying: "A solid shell or ring surrounding a star is mechanically impossible. The form of 'biosphere' which I envisaged consists of a loose collection or swarm of objects traveling on independent orbits around the star." Such a concept has often been referred to as a "Dyson swarm"; however, in 2013, Dyson said he had come to regret that the concept had been named after him. In an interview with Robert Wright in 2003, Dyson referred to his paper on the search for Dyson spheres as "a little joke" and commented that "you get to be famous only for the things you don't think are serious", later explaining that "And of course the joke is that the sky is crawling with infrared sources which look just the way a Type II civilization might look, so there is absolutely no reason to believe that they are artificial ... from our distance they would look the same". However, in a later interview with students from The University of Edinburgh in 2018, he referred to the premise of the Dyson sphere as being "correct and uncontroversial". In other interviews, while lamenting the naming of the object, Dyson commented that "the idea was a good one", and referred to his contribution to a paper on disassembling planets as a means of constructing one.

== Search for megastructures ==
Dyson-style energy collectors around a distant star would absorb and re-radiate energy from the star. The wavelengths of such re-radiated energy may be atypical for the star's spectral type, due to the presence of heavy elements not naturally occurring within the star. If the percentage of such atypical wavelengths were to be significant, an alien megastructure could be detected at interstellar distances. This could indicate the presence of what has been called a Type II Kardashev civilization.

SETI has looked for such infrared-heavy spectra from solar analogs, as has Fermilab. Fermilab discovered 17 potential "ambiguous" candidates, of which four were in 2006 called "amusing but still questionable". Later searches also resulted in several candidates, all of which remain unconfirmed.

On October 14, 2015, Planet Hunters' citizen scientists discovered unusual light fluctuations of the star KIC 8462852 raising press speculation that a Dyson sphere may have been discovered. However, subsequent analysis showed that the results were consistent with the presence of dust. In 2024 there was press speculation that potential signs of interstellar Dyson spheres had been discovered. The seven objects of interest – all located within a thousand light-years of Earth – were M-dwarfs, a class of stars that are smaller and less luminous than the Sun. However, the authors of the findings were careful not to make any overblown claims. Despite this, many media outlets picked up on the story. Less fantastical explanations included a suggestion that the detected infrared was caused by distant dust-obscured galaxies.

== Feasibility and science-based speculation ==
Although Dyson spheres in the form of a swarm are theoretically possible, building a stable megastructure around the Sun is currently far beyond humanity's engineering capacity. The number of craft required to obtain, transmit, and maintain a complete Dyson sphere exceeds present-day industrial capabilities. Dyson spheres have prompted speculation into the feasibility of a class of proposed stellar engines, hypothetical megastructures whose purpose is to extract useful energy from a star, sometimes for specific purposes. For example, Matrioshka brains have been proposed to use energy extracted by Dyson spheres for computation, while Shkadov thrusters would extract energy for propulsion. Some proposed stellar engine designs are based on the Dyson sphere. Futurist George Dvorsky has advocated the use of self-replicating robots to overcome the limitation of humanity's engineering capacity in the relatively near term. Some have suggested that Dyson sphere habitats could be built around white dwarfs or pulsars.

In 2022 it was suggested that a Dyson swarm around the Sun could be launched from either Mercury or Mars. In order to transmit the energy back, far-field radiative wireless power transfer was proposed, a technology that is not yet fully developed.

== Fictional examples ==
A precursor to the concept of Dyson spheres was featured in the 1937 novel Star Maker by Olaf Stapledon, in which he described "every solar system... surrounded by a gauze of light-traps, which focused the escaping solar energy for intelligent use"; Dyson got his inspiration from this book and suggested that "Stapledon sphere" would be a more apt name for the concept. Fictional Dyson spheres are typically solid structures forming a continuous shell around the star in question, although Dyson himself considered that prospect to be mechanically impossible. They are sometimes used as the type of plot device known as a Big Dumb Object.

Dyson spheres appear as a background element in many works of fiction, including the 1964 novel The Wanderer by Fritz Leiber where aliens enclose multiple stars in this way. Dyson spheres are depicted in the 1975–1983 book series Saga of Cuckoo by Frederik Pohl and Jack Williamson, and one functions as the setting of Bob Shaw's 1975 novel Orbitsville and its sequels. In the 1992 episode "Relics" of the TV show Star Trek: The Next Generation, the USS Enterprise finds itself trapped in an abandoned Dyson sphere; in a 2011 interview, Dyson said that he enjoyed the episode, although he considered the sphere depicted to be "nonsense". Michael Jan Friedman who wrote the novelization observed that in the TV episode itself the Dyson sphere was effectively a MacGuffin, with "just nothing about it" in the story, and decided to flesh out the plot element in his novelization.

Other science-fiction story examples include Tony Rothman's The World Is Round, Somtow Sucharitkul's Inquestor series, Timothy Zahn's Spinneret, James White's Federation World, Stephen Baxter's The Time Ships, and Peter F. Hamilton's Pandora's Star. Variations on the Dyson sphere concept include a single circular band in Larry Niven's 1970 novel Ringworld, a half sphere in the 2012 novel Bowl of Heaven by Gregory Benford and Niven, and nested spheres – also known as a Matrioshka brain – in Colin Kapp's 1980s Cageworld series and Brian Stableford's 1979–1990 Asgard trilogy.

Stableford observed that Dyson spheres are usually treated as MacGuffins or relegated to the background of narratives, citing examples such as Fritz Leiber's The Wanderer and Linda Nagata's Deception Well. Stories in which the concept is explored tend to use variants such as Larry Niven's Ringworld. He identified two reasons for this. First, the sheer scale of a Dyson sphere makes it difficult to address within the constraints of most narratives; Friedman said that he had avoided the issue in his novelisation of “Relics” as the book was only four hundred pages long and he had just shy of four weeks to write it. Secondly, particularly in hard science fiction, Dyson spheres present engineering challenges that complicate their use in storytelling. One such difficulty arises from the shell theorem: within a spherical shell, gravitational forces are in equilibrium, so additional mechanisms such as rotation are required to provide effective gravity at the interior surface. This in turn introduces further complications, including a gravity gradient that diminishes to zero at the poles. Authors have addressed these issues through various modifications of the concept, including Stableford’s Cageworld nesting, Dan Alderson's double-sphere idea, and Niven’s reduced ringworld design.

== See also ==
- Alderson disk – Hypothetical artificial solar megastructure
- Megastructure – Very large artificial object
- List of hypothetical technologies – Possible future technology
- Space elevator – Proposed type of space transportation system
- Stellar engine – Class of hypothetical megastructures
- Tabby's Star – Star noted for unusual dimming events
