= List of severe weather phenomena =

Severe weather phenomena are weather conditions that are hazardous to human life and property.

Severe weather can occur under a variety of situations, but three characteristics are generally needed: a temperature or moisture boundary, moisture, and (in the event of severe, precipitation-based events) instability in the atmosphere.

== Examples ==
=== Atmospheric ===
- Fog
  - Haar (fog)
  - Ice fog

=== Electrical storms ===
- Thunderstorm
  - Derecho
  - Multicellular thunderstorm
  - Pulse storm
  - Squall line
  - Storm cell (single-cell)
  - Supercells, rotating thunderstorms
  - Lightning

=== Fire ===
- Wildfire or bushfire (ignition of wildfires is sometimes by lightning strike, especially in "dry thunderstorms")
  - Firestorm
  - Fire whirl, also called firenado and fire tornado

=== Flood ===
- Floods
  - Flash flood
  - Coastal flooding
  - Tidal flooding
  - Storm surge

=== Oceans and bodies of water ===
- Harmful algal bloom
  - Blue green algae
  - Red tide
- High seas
- Sneaker wave
- High tides
- King tide
- Ice shove
- Rogue wave
- Seiche
- Swell (ocean)
- Tidal surge
- Storm surge
- Rip currents
- Undertow (water waves)
- Whirlpools

==== Snow ====
- Avalanche
- Blizzard
- Lake effect snow
- Snownado
  - Snow devil
  - Polar vortex

==== Ice ====
- Black ice
- Glaze ice
- Hailstorm
- Ice shove
- Ice storm
- Megacryometeor

==== Rain ====
- Acid rain
- Blood rain
- Cold drop (Spanish: gota fría; archaic as a meteorological term), colloquially, any high impact rainfall event along the Mediterranean coast of Spain
- Drought, a prolonged water supply shortage, often caused by persistent lack of, or much reduced, rainfall
- Floods
  - Flash flood
- Rainstorm
- Red rain in Kerala (for related phenomena, see Blood rain)
- Monsoon

=== Surface movement ===
- Avalanche
- Mass wasting and landslips
- Earthquake
  - Landslide
  - Debris flows
  - Mudslide
  - Rockfall
  - Coastal erosion
  - Sinkhole

=== Temperature ===
- Cold wave
- Heat wave
- Heat burst
- Polar vortex

=== Volcano ===
- Volcanic eruption
- Volcanic lightning
- Volcanic ash

=== Wind ===
- Cyclones
  - Extratropical cyclone
    - European windstorms
    - Australian east coast low
  - "Medicane", Mediterranean tropical-like cyclones
  - Polar cyclone
  - Tropical cyclone, also called a hurricane, typhoon, or just "cyclone"
  - Subtropical cyclone
  - Australian east coast low
- Explosive cyclogenesis or weather bomb
- Dust storm
  - Haboob
  - Dust devil
  - Sandstorm
- Hurricane
- Katabatic winds
  - Bohemian wind
  - Bora
  - Piteraq
  - Gregale
  - Anabatic wind
  - Valley exit jet
  - Santa Ana winds
  - Foehn wind
  - Williwaws
  - Chinook
- Gale
- Monsoon
- Nor’easter
- Nor'westers
- Steam devil
- Squall
  - Straight-line winds
  - Derecho
- Tornado (also colloquially referred to as a "whirlwind" or "twister")
  - Landspout
  - Gustnado, a "gust front tornado"
  - Waterspout
- Winter storms
- Wind gust
- Windstorm
- Gust front

=== Other ===
- Heat lightning
- Zud, widespread livestock death, mainly by starvation, caused by climatic conditions
- Hayfever

== Phenomena caused by severe thunderstorms ==
- Derecho
- Extreme wind (70 mph or greater)
- Downpours
- Heavy rain
- Flood, flash flood, coastal flooding
- Hail
- High winds – 93 km/h(58 mph) or higher.
- Lightning (Upper-atmospheric lightning)
- Thundersnow, Snowsquall
- Tornado
- Windstorm (gradient pressure induced)
- Severe thunderstorm (hailstorm, downburst: microbursts and macrobursts)

== Severe weather caused by humans ==
- Air pollution

== See also ==
- Extreme weather
- List of weather-related phenomena
- Meteorology
- Severe weather terminology (United States)
- Space weather
