= Whirlwind =

Meteorological phenomenon

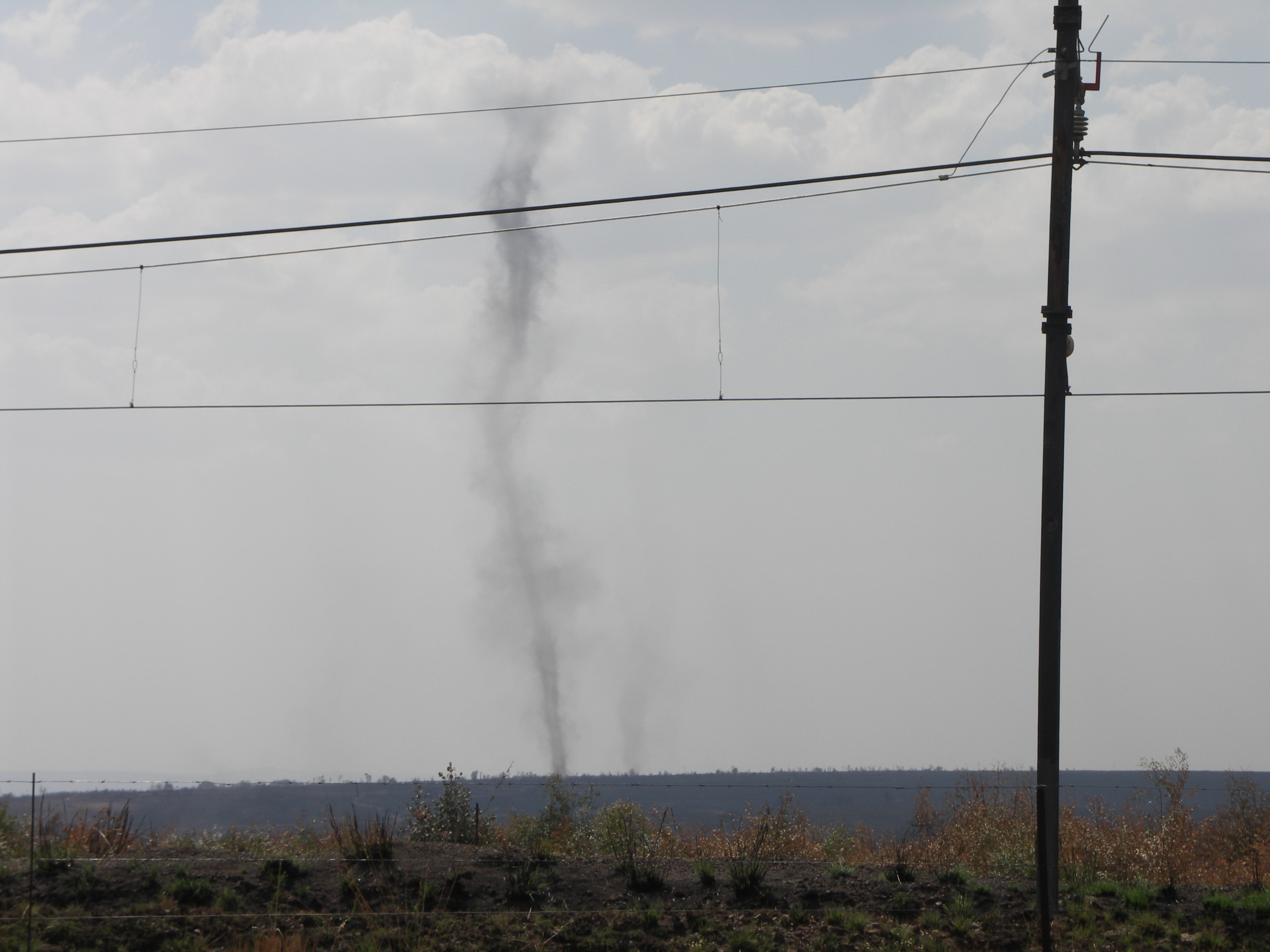
A whirlwind

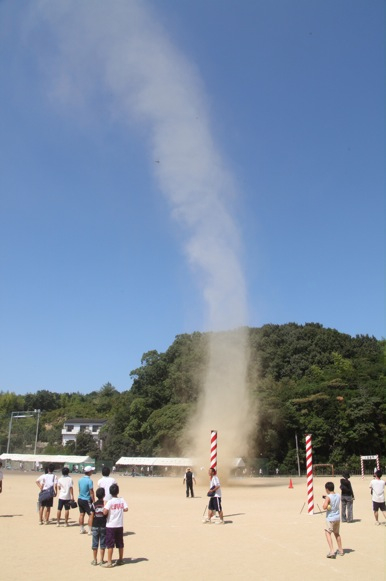
A dust devil at school ground

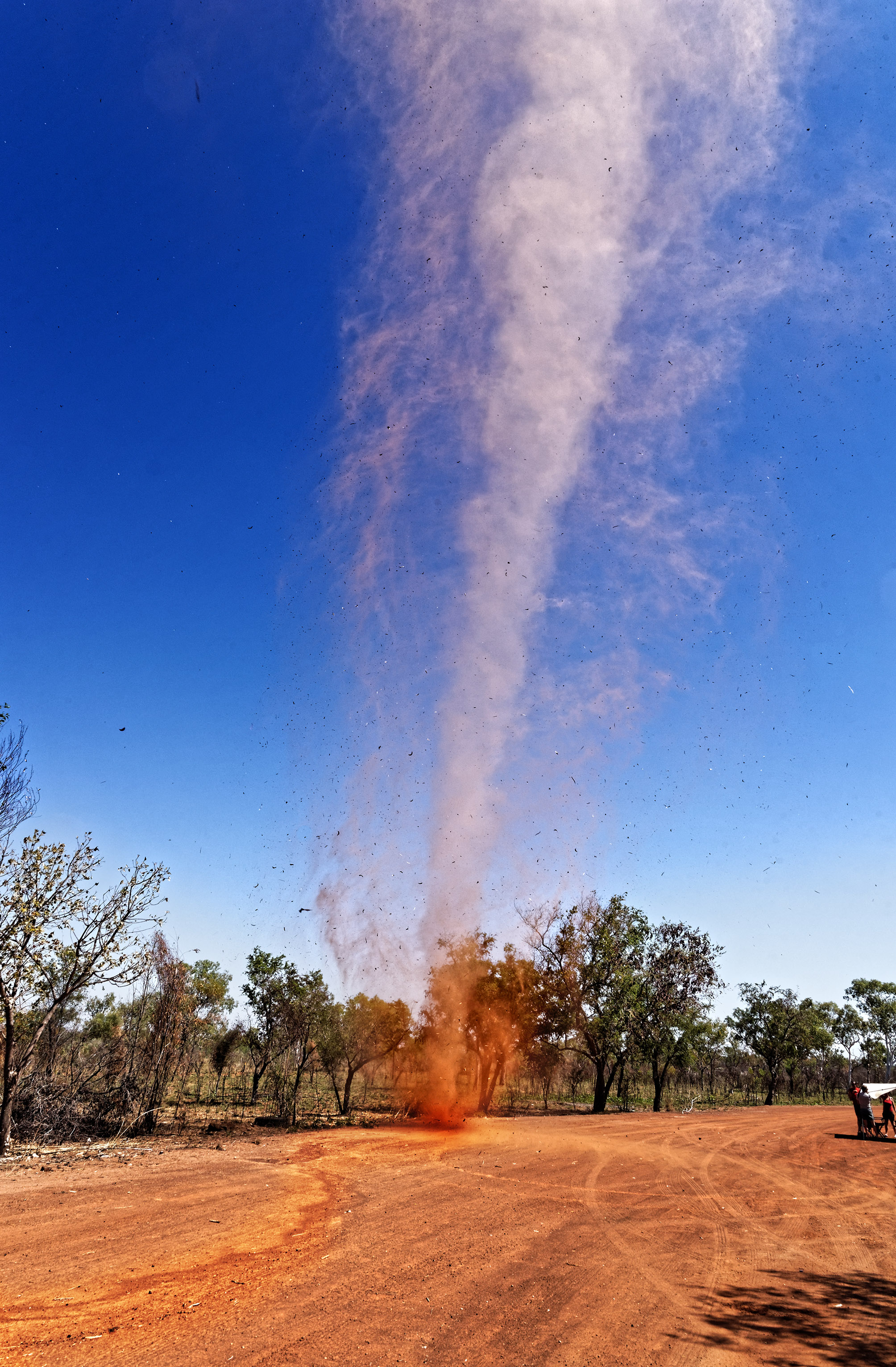
Whirlwind, 61 km northeast of Broome, Western Australia

A whirlwind is a phenomenon in which a vortex of wind (a vertically oriented rotating column of air) forms due to instabilities and turbulence created by heating and flow (current) gradients. Whirlwinds can vary in size and last from a few minutes to a few hours.

== Types ==
Whirlwinds are subdivided into two types, the great (or major) whirlwinds, and the lesser (or minor) whirlwinds. The first category includes tornadoes, waterspouts, and landspouts. The range of atmospheric vortices constitute a continuum and are difficult to categorize definitively. Some lesser whirlwinds may sometimes form in a similar manner to greater whirlwinds with related increase in intensity. These intermediate types include the gustnado and the fire whirl. Other lesser whirlwinds include dust devils, as well as steam devils, snow devils, debris devils, leaf eddy or hay devils, water devils, and shear eddies such as the mountainado and eddy whirlwinds.

== Formation ==
Major whirlwind

A major whirlwind (such as a tornado) is formed from supercell thunderstorms (the most powerful type of thunderstorm) or other powerful storms. When the storms start to spin, they react with other high altitude winds, causing a funnel to spin. A cloud forms over the funnel, making it visible.

Minor whirlwind

A minor whirlwind is created when local winds start to spin on the ground. This causes a funnel to form. The funnel moves over the ground, pushed by the winds that first formed it. The funnel picks up materials such as dust or snow as it moves over the ground, thus becoming visible.

== Duration ==
Major whirlwinds last longer because they are formed from very powerful winds, and it is hard, though not impossible, to interrupt them. Minor whirlwinds are not as long-lived; the winds that form them do not last long, and when a minor whirlwind encounters an obstruction (a building, a house, a tree, etc.), its rotation is interrupted, as is the windflow into it, causing it to dissipate.

== Associated weather ==
Supercell thunderstorms, other powerful storms, and strong winds are seen with major whirlwinds. Wind storms are commonly seen with minor whirlwinds. Also, small, semi-powerful “wind blasts” may be seen before some minor whirlwinds, which can come from a wind storm. These wind blasts can start to rotate and form minor whirlwinds. Winds from other small storms (such as rain storms and local thunderstorms) can cause minor whirlwinds to form. Like major whirlwinds, these minor whirlwinds can also be dangerous at times.

== Similar phenomena ==
Eddies and vortices may form in any fluid. In water, a whirlpool is a similar phenomenon.

== See also ==
- Tropical cyclone
