= Steam devil =

Type of whirlwind

External videos
- Sea smoke and steam devil over the Sea of Japan on December 25, 2021, on the south of Primorsky Krai of Russia, from Yuzhno-Morskoy (near Nakhodka).

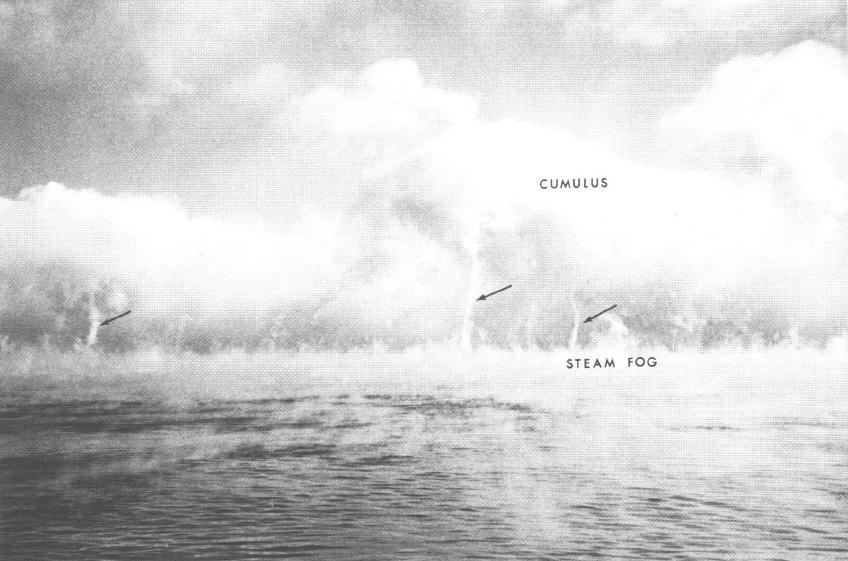
Steam devils on Lake Michigan 31 January 1971, from the paper which first named and reported the phenomenon.

A steam devil is a small, weak whirlwind over water (or sometimes wet land) that has drawn fog into the vortex, thus rendering it visible. They form over large lakes and oceans during cold air outbreaks while the water is still relatively warm, and can be an important mechanism in vertically transporting moisture. They are a component of sea smoke.

Smaller steam devils and steam whirls can form over geyser basins even in warm weather because of the very high water temperatures. Although observations of steam devils are generally quite rare, hot springs in Yellowstone Park produce them on a daily basis.

Steam devils have only been reported and studied since the 1970s. They are weaker than waterspouts and distinct from them. The latter are more akin to weak tornadoes over water.

== Naming ==
Steam devils were first reported by Lyons and Pease in 1972 concerning their observations of Lake Michigan in January 1971. This month was a particularly cold one for Wisconsin (one of the coldest in the 20th century) which, combined with Lake Michigan staying mostly ice-free, produced good conditions for steam devil formation. Lyons and Pease named steam devils by comparison to the dust devils on land to which they have a comparable size and structure. They were also motivated by the need to distinguish steam devils from the much more powerful waterspout whose land equivalent is the tornado. Lyons and Pease wrote their article with the aim of persuading the National Oceanic and Atmospheric Administration to include steam devils in the International Field Year for the Great Lakes which was imminently to occur in 1972–1973.

== Appearance ==
Steam devils are vortices typically about 50 to 200 m (160 to 660 feet) in diameter, essentially vertical, and up to 500 m (1,600 feet) high. The general shape is like a small waterspout but they should not be considered related. Steam devils rotate with a cyclonic direction of motion, but not very fast or powerfully, usually just a few rotations per minute, and sometimes apparently not at all. There is usually a well-defined inner part of the rotating column of steam and a more ragged outer part from which clumps of steam often detach. Rather smaller steam devils can form over small lakes, especially the warm water in the hot springs of geyser basins. In these cases typical dimensions are 1 m (3 1/4 ft) or so diameter, but can vary from less than 0.1 to 2 m (3/8 to 6 1/2 ft), and a height of 2 to 30 m (6 1/2 to 98 3/8 ft) with a somewhat faster rotation of 60 rpm (1 Hz) or so. The central core of the steam devil can be clear, in the same sense that the centre of a dust devil is clear of dust. The core is around 10% of the width of the rotating column. The sky above the steam devils may be clear, or there may be cumulus clouds present. In some cases the steam devils may rise directly into the cumulus, in these cases the cumulus may actually be caused by the steam devils—see below. Steam devils are a rare and short-lived phenomenon, typically surviving no more than three or four minutes, and the smaller ones over hot springs dissipating in a matter of seconds. (Note: Bluestein differs from other sources in almost every metric describing steam devils, so much so that he might almost be describing a different phenomenon. Bluestein gives the diameter as 3 feet [1 m]; Lyons and Pease have 50 to 200 m [160 to 660 ft]. Bluestein has the height as up to 20 feet [6 m], Lyons and Pease have 1,500 feet [460 m]. Bluestein states the minimum necessary temperature difference between air and water to be 68 °F [38 °C]; Lyons and Pease give a counter-example of 39 °F [22 °C]. Bluestein states there is usually a clear sky; MacDougal and Lyons and Pease both provide photographs with cumulus cloud above. Barrick gives small dimensions comparable to Bluestein, but only in relation to steam devils over geyser basins.) Steam devils are sometimes confused with waterspouts as they can occur over the water.

Steam devils can become detached from their base and be blown downstream by the wind. On small bodies of water such as hot springs this can mean that the steam devil ends up over land away from the water altogether. Such steam devils continue to rotate even after they have become detached from the source of heat, but will soon dissipate.

Very small steam devils may have a poorly defined column and no identifiable clear inner core. Such vortices are more properly called steam whirls by analogy with the dust whirls of land.

== Formation ==
A precondition for the formation of steam devils is the presence of a layer of moist air on the water with the misty air (called arctic steam fog) being drawn upwards into fog streamers (non-rotating columns of steam fog). For this to happen the body of water must be unfrozen, and thus relatively warm, and there must be some wind of cold, dry air to form the fog. The cold air is warmed by the water and is humidified by evaporation. The warmed air begins to rise, and as it does so is cooled adiabatically by the falling pressure causing the water vapour content to condense out into fog streamers.

For steam devils to form the air above the body of water must be very cold, and a fairly brisk (over 3.2 km/h or 2 mph) wind of dry air needs to be blowing across the surface of the water. The temperature difference between the water and the air needs to be quite marked; the steam devils in figure 1 were forming with an air temperature of −21 °C (−6 °F) and a water temperature of 1 °C (33 °F)—a difference of 22 °C (39 °F). Under these conditions the air rises so energetically that the air flow becomes unstable and vortices start to form. Fog streamers drawn into the vortices render the vortices visible and they then become steam devils.

The steam fog tends to form irregular hexagonal cells in the horizontal plane which are elongated in the direction of the wind. In this honeycomb arrangement, three cells meet at a junction, and it is in these places that the steam devils form. This effect of vortex formation at the vertices of hexagonal cells is an example of vertex vortices.

The layer of cumulus seen above steam devils during cold air outbreaks on Lake Michigan and elsewhere may not be coincidental. Airborne radar studies during cold air outbreaks on the lake have shown that some steam devils penetrate through the thermal internal boundary layer (below which convective circulation takes place) and may be more significant for thermal mixing than normal convection, transporting moist air vertically above the convection boundary. The resulting large scale view is a layer of arctic steam fog close to the water surface, a layer of cumulus just above the convection boundary and a regular array of steam devils joining the two.

== Occurrences ==
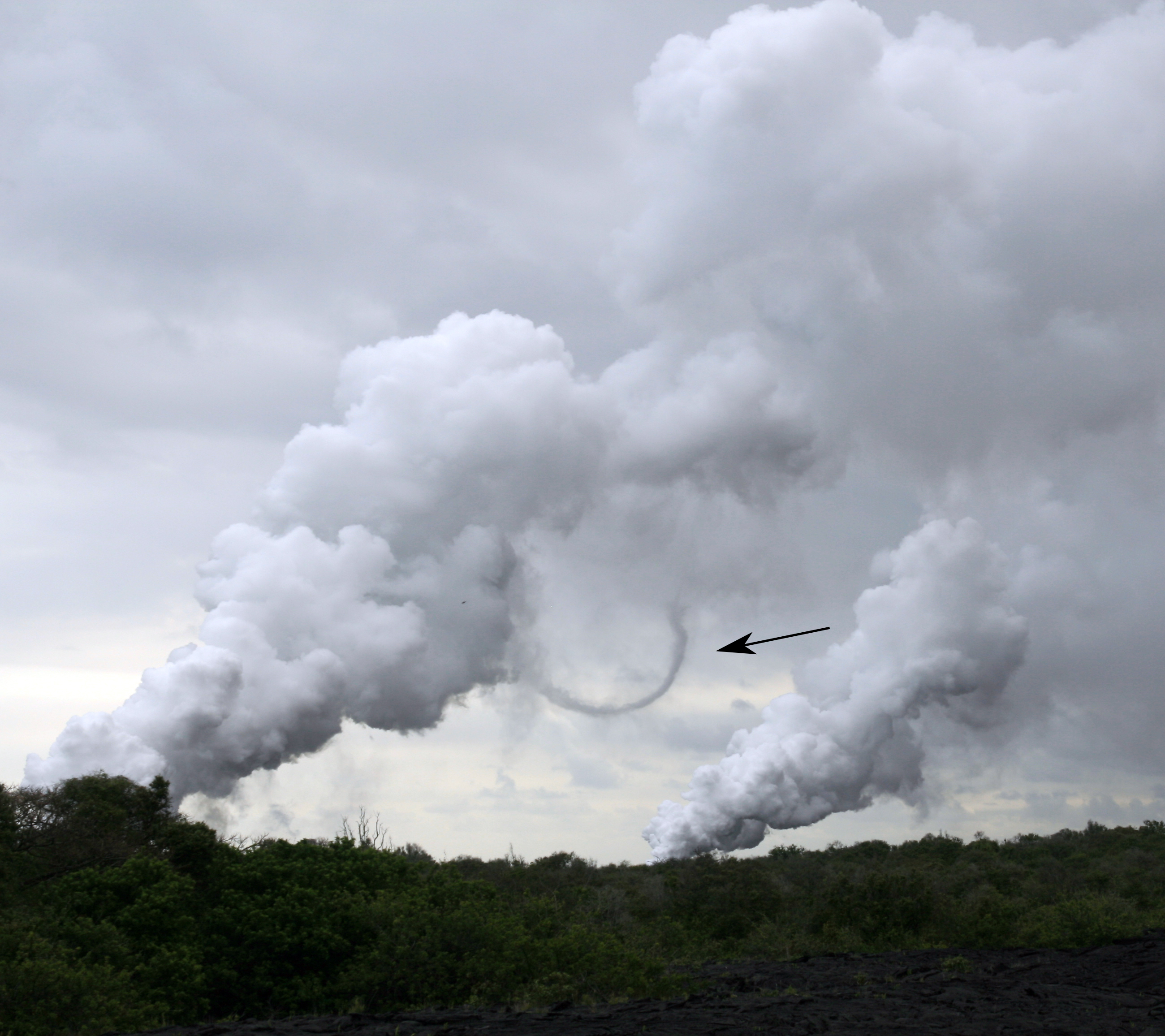
Steam devil at Big Island, Hawaii. The large plumes of vapour are caused by lava entering the ocean.

Steam devils are seen on the Great Lakes in early winter. They occur in the Atlantic off the coast of the Carolinas when cold air from the continent blows across the Gulf Stream. Steam devils can occur on small lakes and even over hot springs, but rather more rarely than on large bodies of water. It is also possible for steam devils to form over wet land if the air is cold and the sun is heating the ground.

Small steam devils occur at some of the larger hot springs in Yellowstone Park where a layer of steam fog hangs over the pools and wind can start to lift it up into fog streamers. One such example is the Grand Prismatic Spring in the Yellowstone Midway Geyser Basin. The air temperature can be high in terms of human comfort when the steam devils form. In 1982 a cluster of seventeen steam devils was observed when the air temperature was between 17 and 21 °C (63 and 70 °F). Although this is much higher than, for instance, the temperature of the air over the Great Lakes, the water temperature is also proportionately higher, being very close to boiling, so the temperature difference is still 79 °C (142 °F).

Another well known location in Yellowstone, the Old Faithful geyser, produces horizontal steam devils. In all, Yellowstone probably has the most frequent occurrences of accessible steam devils anywhere. Several steam devils are produced every hour at the most productive locations. Steam devils over geyser basins were first reported by Holle in 1977.

== See also ==
- Dust devil
- Fire whirl
- Gustnado
- Landspout
- Sea smoke

== Bibliography ==
- Allaby, Michael (2002). Encyclopedia of Weather and Climate. Vol. 1. New York: Facts on File. ISBN 0-8160-4801-0.
- Barrick, Kenneth A. (1 February 2010). "Environmental Review of Geyser Basins: Resources, Scarcity, Threats, and Benefits". Environmental Reviews. 18 (1): 209–238. doi:10.1139/A10-008. JSTOR envirevi.18.209.
- Bluestein, Howard B. (1999). Tornado Alley: Monster Storms of the Great Plains. New York: Oxford University Press. ISBN 0-19-510552-4.
- Holle, Ronald L. (July 1977). "'Steam Devils' Over a Geyser Basin". Monthly Weather Review. 105 (7): 930–932.
- Holle, Ronald L. (May–June 2007). "lookingback: Yellowstone Steam Devils". Weatherwise. 60 (3): 9. doi:10.3200/WEWI.60.3.8-9.
- Lyons, W. A.; Pease, S. R. (March 1972). "'Steam Devils' Over Lake Michigan During a January Arctic Outbreak" (PDF). Monthly Weather Review. 100 (3): 235–237. Archived from the original (PDF) on 14 January 2014.
- Zurn-Birkhimer, Suzanne; Agee, Ernest M.; Sorbjan, Zbigniew (July 2005). "Convective Structures in a Cold Air Outbreak Over Lake Michigan During Lake-ICE". Journal of the Atmospheric Sciences. 62 (7.2): 2414–2432.
