= Sea smoke =

Fog which is formed when very cold air moves over warmer water

External videos
- Sea smoke and steam devil over the Sea of Japan on 25 December 2021, on the south of Primorsky Krai of Russia, from Yuzhno-Morskoy (near Nakhodka)

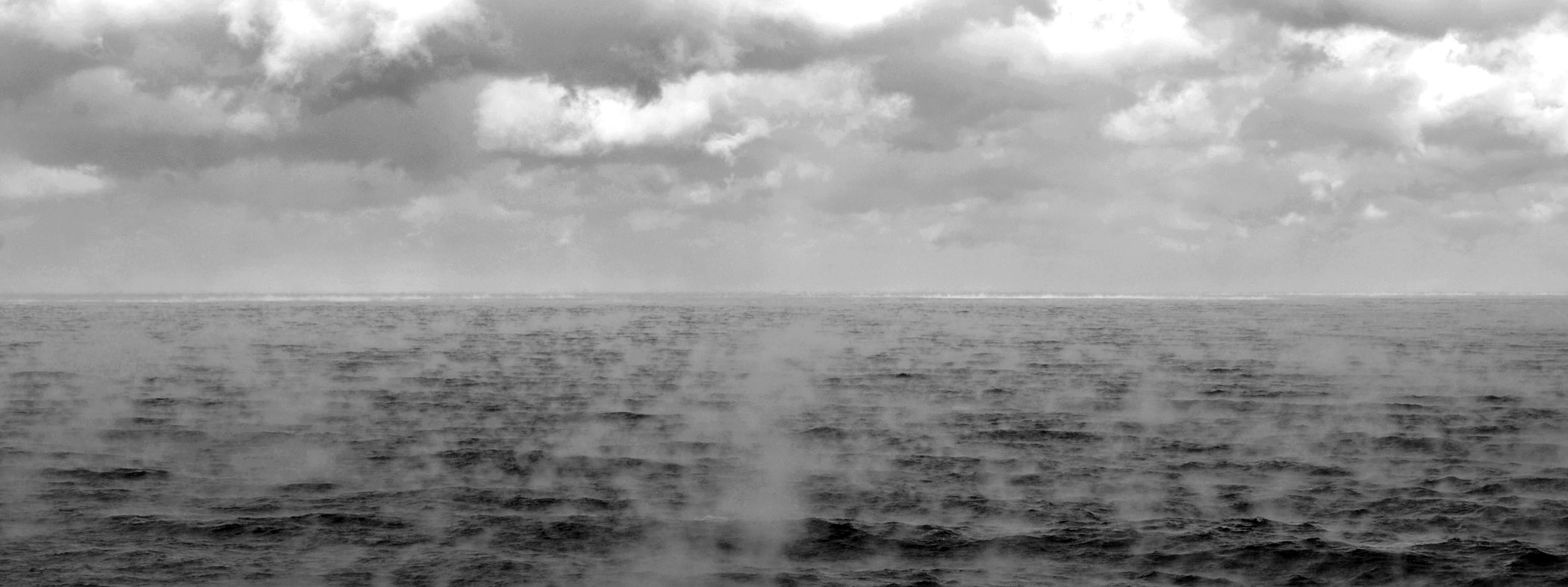
Sea smoke on the Atlantic Ocean

Steam fog over a small lake on an early summer morning in June 2014 in Bergen, Norway

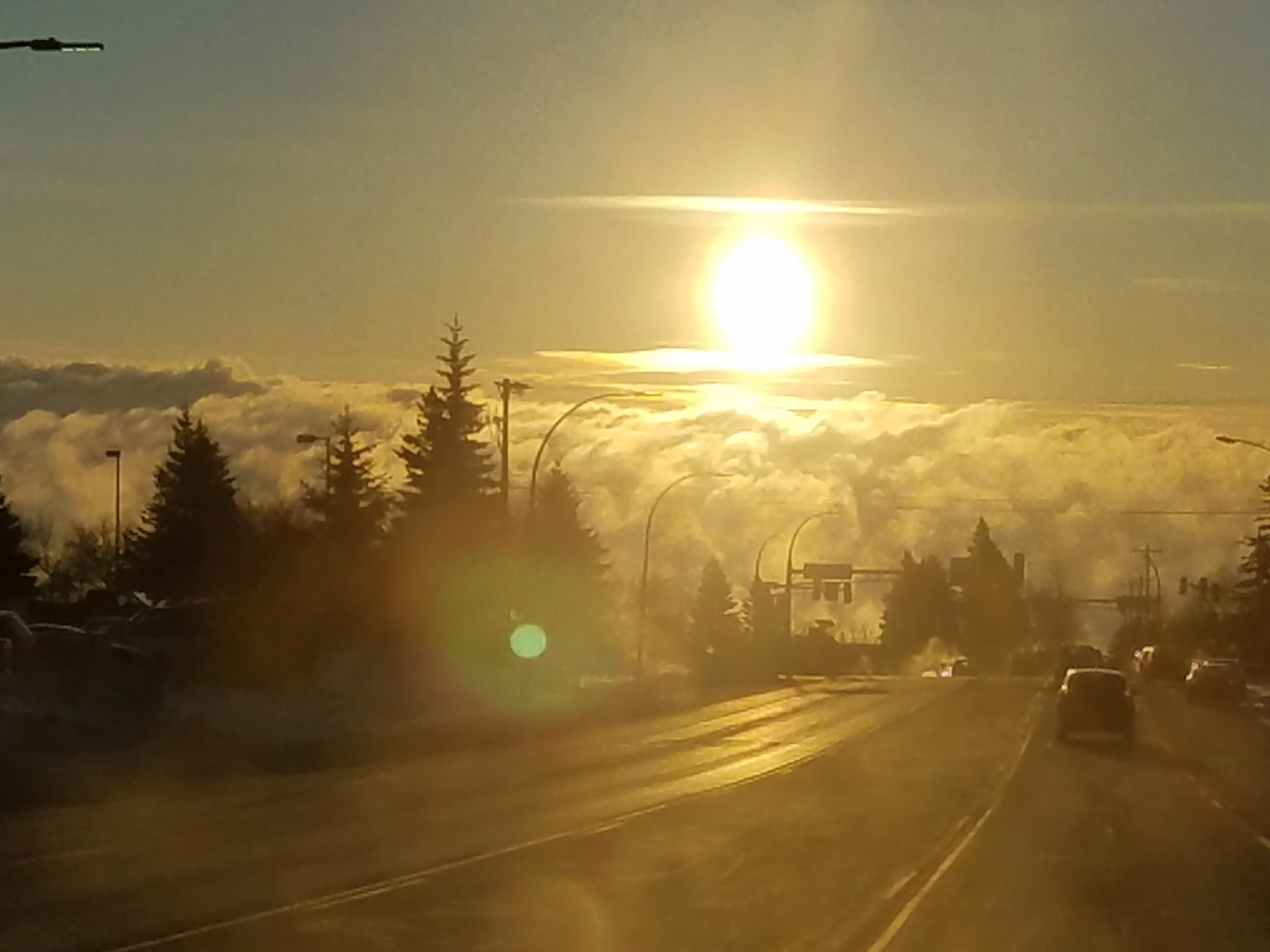
Sea smoke over Lake Superior, Duluth, Minnesota. 5 January 2017

Sea smoke, frost smoke, or steam fog is fog which is formed when very cold air moves over warmer water. Arctic sea smoke is sea smoke forming over small patches of open water in sea ice.

It forms when a light wind of very cold air mixes with a shallow layer of saturated warm air immediately above the warmer water. The warmer air is cooled beyond the dew point and can no longer hold as much water vapor, so the excess condenses out. The effect is similar to the "steam" produced over a hot bath or a hot drink, or even an exercising person.

Sea smoke has a turbulent appearance and may form spiraling columns. It is usually not very high and lookouts on ships can usually see over it (but small boats may have very poor visibility) because the fog is confined to the layer of warm air above the sea. However, sea smoke columns 20–30 m (70–100 ft) high have been observed. Because this type of fog requires very low air temperatures, it is uncommon in temperate climates, but is common in the Arctic and Antarctic.

== See also ==
- Steam devil
