= Gustnado =

Ground vortex formed from a downburst of a thunderstorm

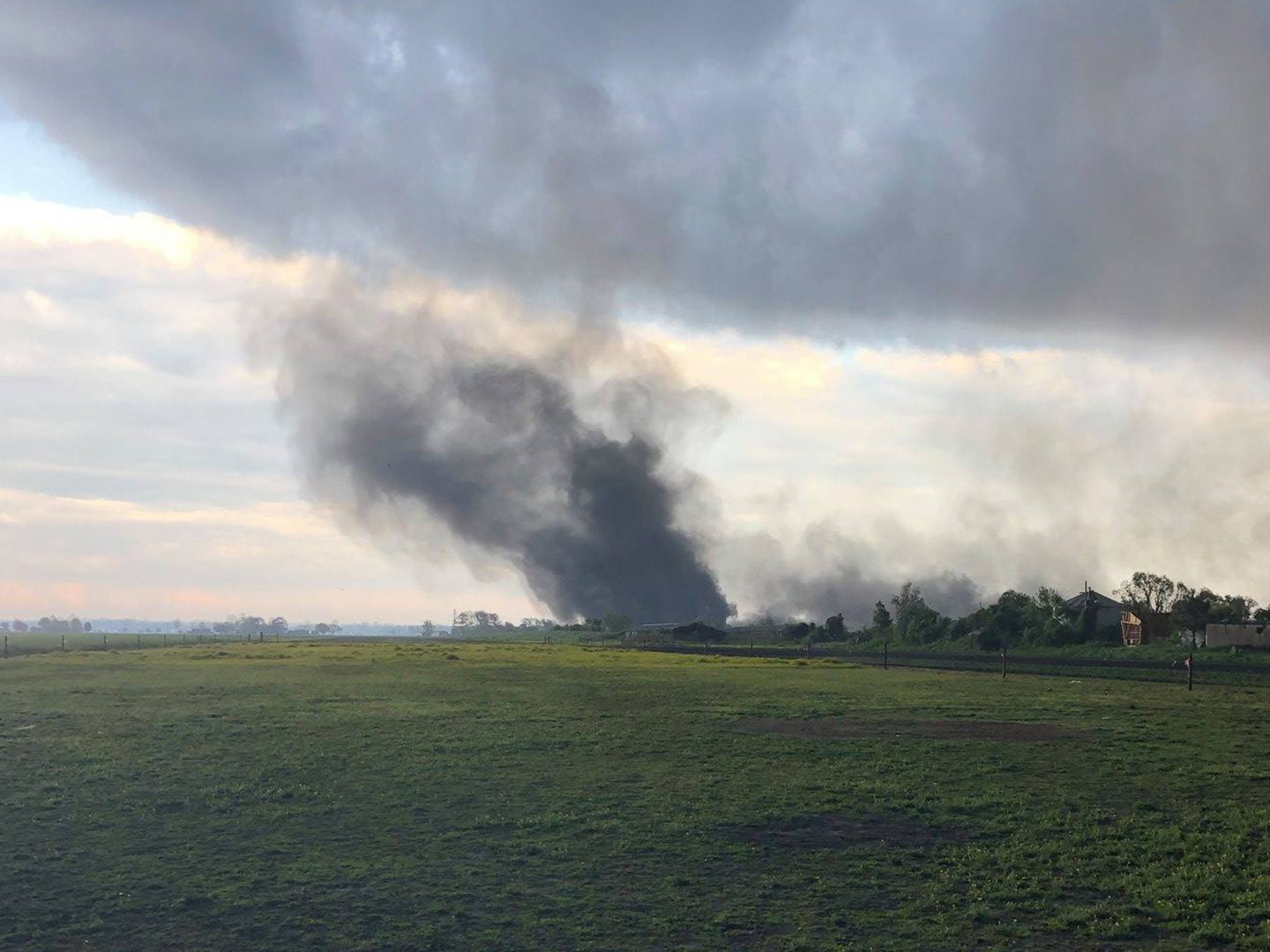
A gustnado near Swan Quarter, North Carolina, on 26 April 2019

A gustnado is a brief, shallow surface-based vortex which forms within the downburst emanating from a thunderstorm. The name is a portmanteau by elision of "gust front tornado", as gustnadoes form due to non-tornadic straight-line wind features in the downdraft (outflow), specifically within the gust front of strong thunderstorms. Gustnadoes tend to be noticed when the vortices loft sufficient debris or form condensation clouds to be visible, although it is the wind that makes the gustnado, similar to tornadoes. As these eddies very rarely connect from the surface to the cloud base, they are very rarely considered tornadoes. Gustnadoes differ from tornadoes structurally and dynamically in their vertical development, intensity, longevity, and formation; classic tornadoes are associated with mesocyclones within the inflow (updraft) of the storm rather than the outflow.

The average gustnado lasts a few seconds to a few minutes, although there can be several generations and simultaneous swarms. Most have the winds equivalent to an F0 or F1 tornado (up to 180 km/h or 110 mph), and are commonly mistaken for tornadoes. However, unlike tornadoes, the rotating column of air in a gustnado usually does not extend all the way to the base of the thundercloud. Gustnadoes actually have more in common with (minor) whirlwinds. They are not considered true tornadoes (unless they connect the surface to the ambient cloud base, in which case they'd become a landspout) by most meteorologists and are not included in tornado statistics in most areas. Sometimes referred to as spin-up tornadoes, that term more correctly describes the rare tornadic gustnado that connects the surface to the ambient clouded base, or more commonly to the relatively brief but true tornadoes that are associated with a mesovortex.

The most common setting for a gustnado is along the gust front of a severe thunderstorm (by many definitions, containing wind speeds of at least 93 km/h or 58 mph), along which horizontal shear of the wind may be large. A particularly common location is along the rear-flank gust front of supercell storms. Gustnadoes probably form owing to shear instability associated with the strong horizontal shear; a relative maximum in vertical vorticity must exist for shear instability to be present. The bigger question is probably what the dynamical origin(s) of the vertical vorticity are, such as the tilting of horizontal vorticity into the vertical or vertical vorticity in the ambient environment that preexists the storm. Along the rear-flank gust front of supercell storms, vertical vorticity very likely has its origins in the upward tilting of vorticity that can occur within descending air in the presence of baroclinity.

While injuries or deaths from gustnadoes are uncommon, stronger gustnadoes can cause localized damage and pose hazards to drivers. For example, a gustnado confirmed by the National Weather Service near Swan Quarter, North Carolina, on 26 April 2019, produced damage to buildings and an estimated maximum wind speed of 130 km/h or 80 mph, but caused no reported injuries or fatalities. Following the collapse of a stage at the Indiana State Fair on August 13, 2011, early media reports speculated that a gustnado had been involved; however, a later engineering investigation found that the structure failed because its lateral load-bearing construction was incapable of taking the wind loads present at the time of the collapse.

== See also ==
- Dust devil, whirlwinds that form due to superheated surface layers and stretched vorticity, most commonly on sunny, warm days with light winds
- Fujita scale
- Landspout
- Waterspout
