= Landspout =

Type of tornado not originating from a mesocyclone

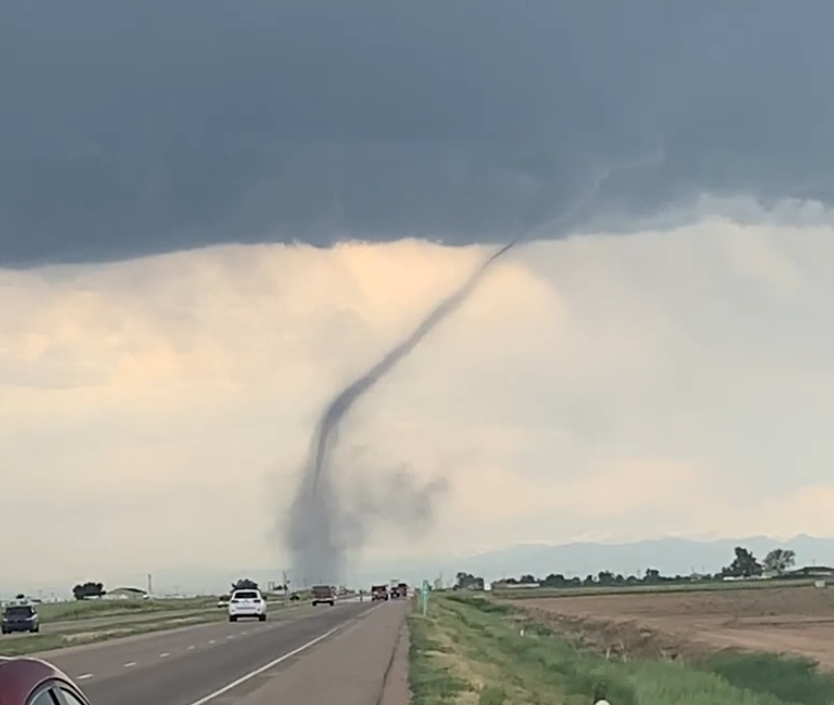
- Landspout in Colorado, 2021
- Area of occurrence: Every continent
- Season: Any
- Effect: Wind damage

A landspout is a type of tornado not associated with a rotating mesocyclone. Atmospheric scientist Howard Bluestein coined the term in 1985 because these columns of air resemble weak Florida Keys waterspouts occurring over land. Unlike classic supercell tornadoes, landspouts form during the growth stage of a developing convective cloud as ground-level rotation is pulled upward, making them generally weaker and short-lived.

== Characteristics ==
Landspouts are a type of tornado that form during the growth stage of a cumulus congestus or occasionally a cumulonimbus cloud when an updraft stretches boundary-layer vorticity upward and tightens it into a focused vertical axis. Landspouts can also occur due to interactions from outflow boundaries, as they can occasionally cause enhanced convergence and vorticity at the surface. These generally are smaller and weaker than supercell tornadoes and do not form from a mesocyclone or pre-existing rotation in the cloud. Landspouts can form in the flanking line of supercell thunderstorms, following the predominant formation area of landspouts in general within updraft zones without undercutting downdrafts. Because of their lower depth, smaller size, and weaker intensity, landspouts are rarely detected by Doppler weather radar.

Landspouts share a strong resemblance and development process to that of waterspouts, usually taking the form of a translucent and highly laminar helical tube. Landspouts are technically considered tornadoes, as they are in contact with both the ground and a cumuliform cloud. Not all landspouts are visible, and many are first sighted as debris rotating at the surface before eventually condensing.

Orography can influence landspout (and, consequently, supercell) development. A notable example is the propensity for landspout occurrence in the Denver Convergence Vorticity Zone (DCVZ).

== Life cycle ==
Dying Colorado landspout, 2025

Landspouts originate as ground-level rotation that is pulled upward by a developing parent cloud's updraft. While most landspouts are relatively short-lived (typically just few minutes), rarely some can persist much longer and cause significant damage. They typically progress through distinct stages of formation, maturation, and dissipation. Decay occurs when a nearby downdraft or rain-cooled outflow undercuts the parent cloud's updraft, severing the surface vortex from its low-pressure source. Landspouts can occur individually or form in lines and clusters.

=== Transition to mesocyclonic tornado ===
Rarely, a landspout may transition into a mesocyclonic tornado if the attendant misocyclone merges into a stronger mesocyclone. A notable example occurred during the 1997 Central Texas tornado outbreak, where a landspout touched down along a surface boundary before merging with a supercell's mesocyclone and rapidly intensifying into a catastrophic F5 tornado.

== Damage ==
Most landspouts are relatively weak, not surpassing the EF0 category. However, on rare occasions, they have been observed to reach up to EF2 and EF3 intensity.

Examples of such unusually strong landspouts include:

- 15 June 1988 – Four landspouts struck the areas in and around the city of Denver, Colorado. Two of them were rated F1, one was rated F2, and another one was rated F3.
- 26 May 2018 – Kaniosy and Podkońce, Poland tornado – rated F2 (later changed to IF2);
- 7 June 2021 – Weld County tornado – rated EF2;
- 13 September 2025 – Montezuma Creek, Utah tornado – rated EF2;
- 4 October 2025 – Oppdal, Norway tornado – rated IF2;

== See also ==
- Dust devil
- Fire whirl
- Funnel cloud
- Gustnado
- Steam devil
- Tornadogenesis
- Vortex engine
- Whirlwind
