= Waterspout =

Vortex or tornado occurring over a body of water

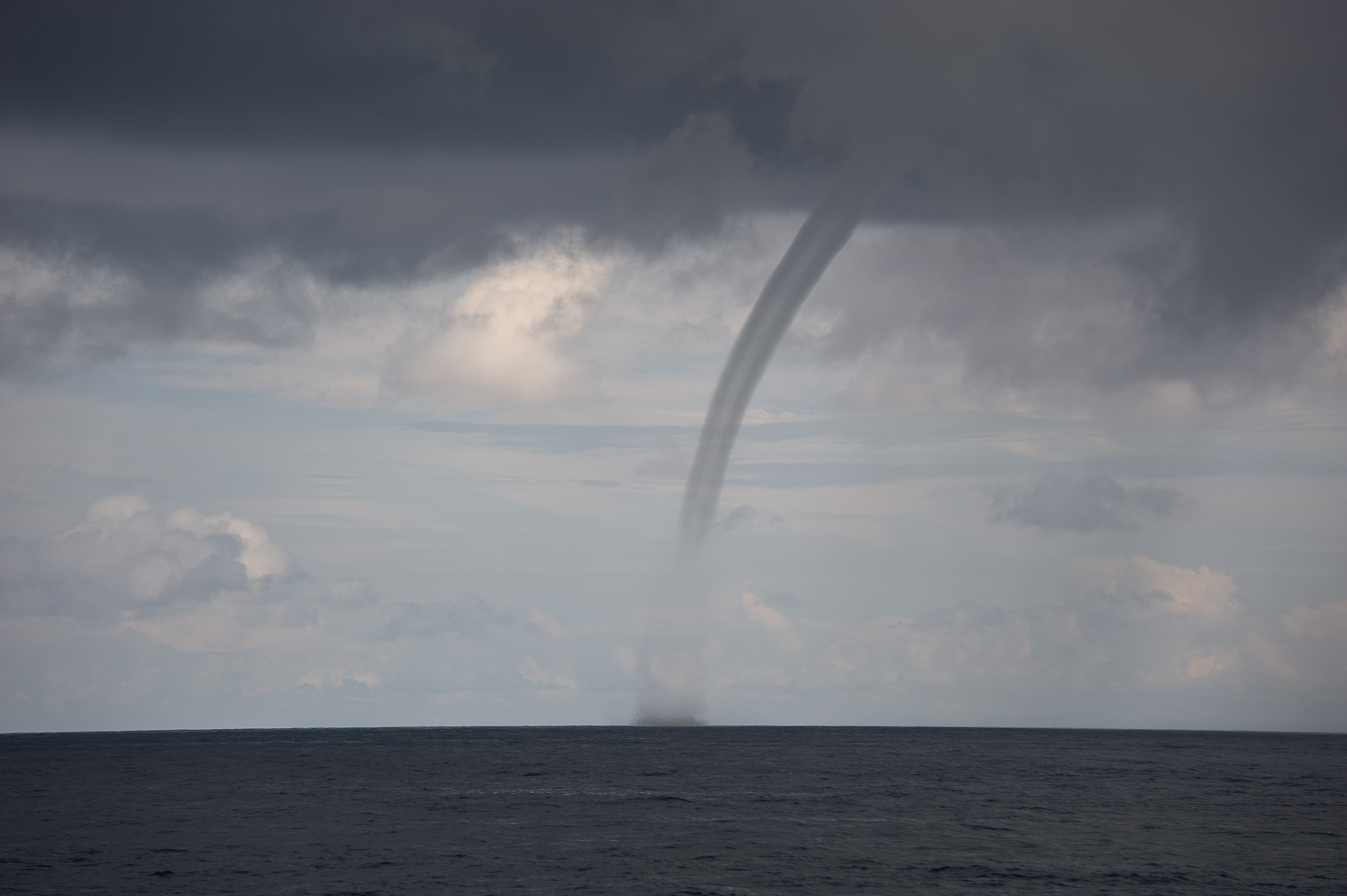
- Non-tornadic waterspout off the coast of Thailand, 9 December 2016
- Area of occurrence: Every continent
- Season: Any
- Effect: Wind damage

A waterspout is a rotating column of air that occurs over a body of water, usually appearing as a funnel-shaped cloud in contact with the water and a cumuliform cloud. There are two types of waterspout, each formed by distinct mechanisms. The most common type is a weak vortex known as a "fair weather" or "non-tornadic" waterspout. The other less common type is simply a classic tornado occurring over water rather than land, known as a "tornadic", "supercellular", or "mesocyclonic" waterspout, and accurately a "tornado over water". A fair weather waterspout has a five-part life cycle: formation of a dark spot on the water surface; spiral pattern on the water surface; formation of a spray ring; development of a visible condensation funnel; and ultimately, decay. Most waterspouts do not suck up water.

While waterspouts form mostly in tropical and subtropical areas, they are also reported in Europe, Western Asia (the Middle East), Australia, New Zealand, the Great Lakes, Antarctica, and on rare occasions, the Great Salt Lake. Some are also found on the East Coast of the United States, and the coast of California. Although rare, waterspouts have been observed in connection with lake-effect snow precipitation bands.

== Characteristics ==
=== Climatology ===
Though the majority of waterspouts occur in the tropics, they can seasonally appear in temperate areas throughout the world, and are common across the western coast of Europe as well as the British Isles and several areas of the Mediterranean and Baltic Sea. They are not restricted to saltwater; many have been reported on lakes and rivers including the Great Lakes and the St. Lawrence River. They are fairly common on the Great Lakes during late summer and early fall, with a record 66+ waterspouts reported over just a seven-day period in 2003.

Waterspouts are more frequent within 100 km (60 mi) from the coast than farther out at sea. They are common along the southeast U.S. coast, especially off southern Florida and the Keys, and can happen over seas, bays, and lakes worldwide. Approximately 160 waterspouts are currently reported per year across Europe, with the Netherlands reporting the most at 60, followed by Spain and Italy at 25, and the United Kingdom at 15. They are most common in late summer. In the Northern Hemisphere, September has been pinpointed as the prime month of formation. Waterspouts are also frequently observed off the east coast of Australia, with several being described by Joseph Banks during the voyage of the Endeavour in 1770.

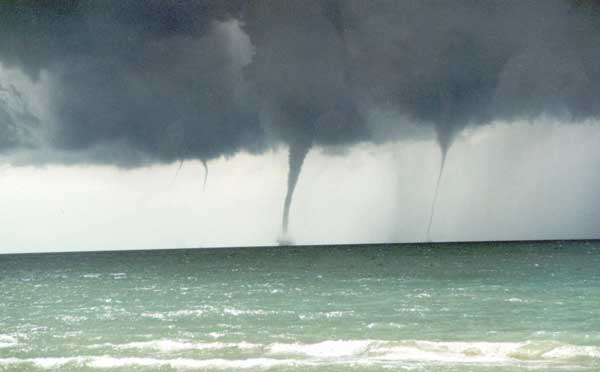
A family of four waterspouts seen on Lake Huron, 9 September 1999

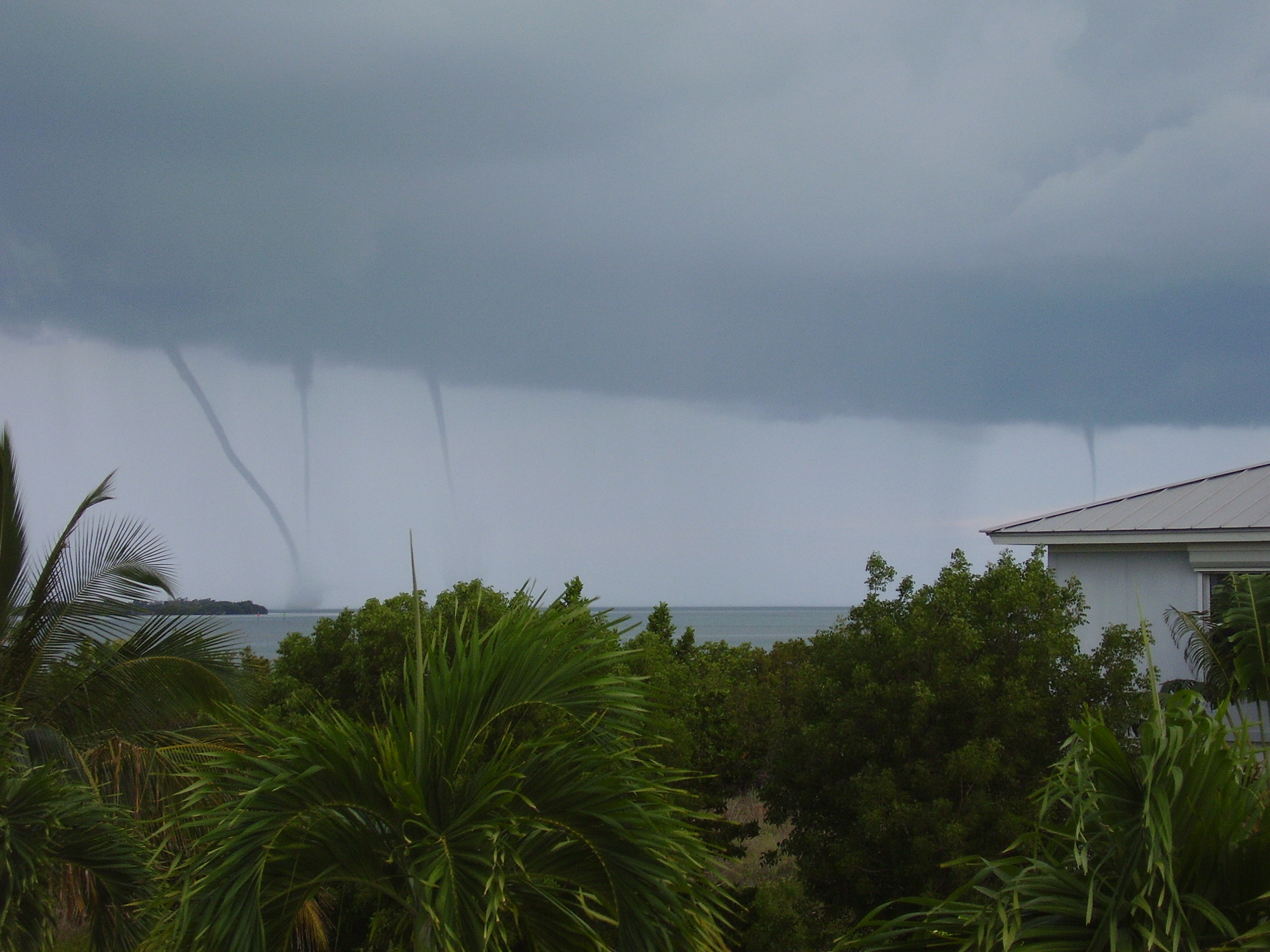
Four waterspouts seen in the Florida Keys, 5 June 2009

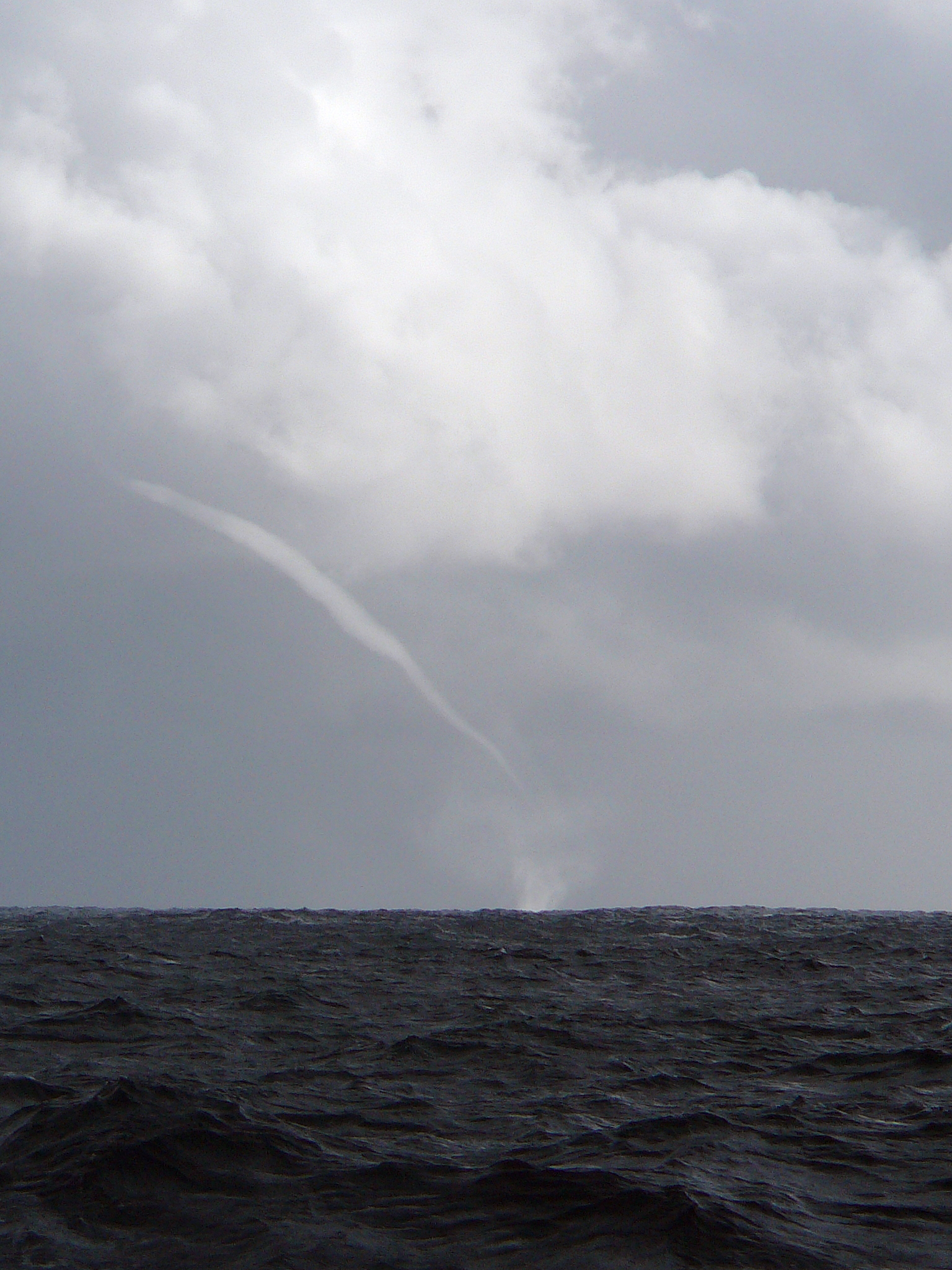
Waterspout in the Tasman Sea, 29 January 2009

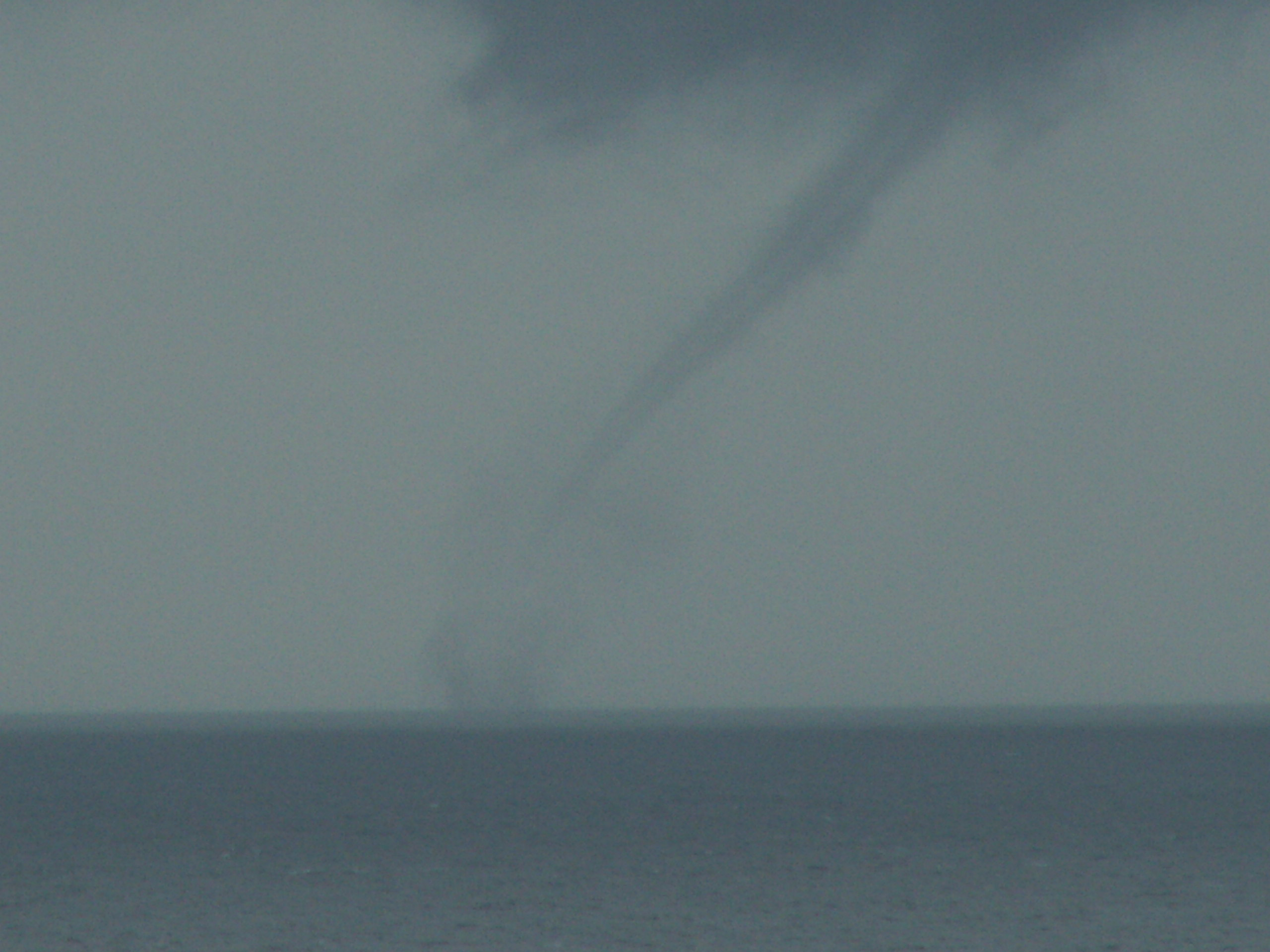
Waterspout in Adelaide, South Australia, June 20, 2014.

=== Formation ===
Waterspouts exist on a microscale, where their environment is less than two kilometers in width. The cloud from which they develop can be as innocuous as a moderate cumulus, or as great as a supercell. While some waterspouts are strong and tornadic in nature, most are much weaker and caused by different atmospheric dynamics. They normally develop in moisture-laden environments as their parent clouds are in the process of development, and it is theorized they spin as they move up the surface boundary from the horizontal shear near the surface, and then stretch upwards to the cloud once the low-level shear vortex aligns with a developing cumulus cloud or thunderstorm. Some weak tornadoes, known as landspouts, have been shown to develop in a similar manner.

More than one waterspout can occur simultaneously in the same vicinity. In 2012, as many as nine simultaneous waterspouts were reported on Lake Michigan in the United States. In May 2021, at least five simultaneous waterspouts were filmed near Taree, off the northern coast of New South Wales, Australia.

== Types ==
=== Non-tornadic ===
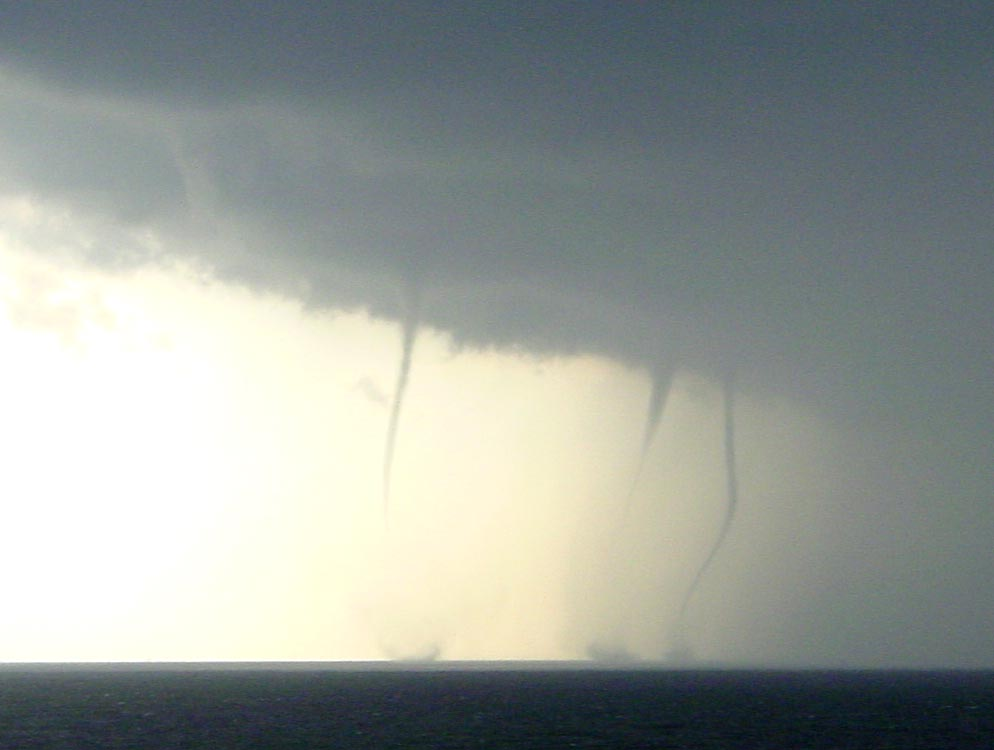
Non-tornadic waterspouts seen from the beach at Kijkduin near The Hague in the Netherlands, 27 August 2006

Waterspouts that are not associated with a rotating updraft of a supercell thunderstorm are known as "non-tornadic" or "fair-weather" waterspouts. By far the most common type of waterspout, these occur in coastal waters and are associated with dark, flat-bottomed, developing convective cumulus towers. Fair-weather waterspouts develop and dissipate rapidly, having life cycles shorter than 20 minutes. They usually rate no higher than EF0 on the Enhanced Fujita scale, generally exhibiting winds of less than 30 m/s (67 mph; 108 km/h).

They are most frequently seen in tropical and sub-tropical climates, with upwards of 400 per year observed in the Florida Keys. They typically move slowly, if at all, since the cloud to which they are attached is horizontally static, being formed by vertical convective action rather than the subduction/adduction interaction between colliding fronts. Fair-weather waterspouts are very similar in both appearance and mechanics to landspouts, and largely behave as such if they move ashore.

Five stages of a fair-weather waterspout lifecycle

There are five stages to a fair-weather waterspout life cycle. Initially, a prominent circular, light-colored disk appears on the surface of the water, surrounded by a larger dark area of indeterminate shape. After the formation of these colored disks on the water, a pattern of light- and dark-colored spiral bands develops from the dark spot on the water surface. Then, a dense annulus of sea spray, called a "cascade", appears around the dark spot with what appears to be an eye. Eventually, the waterspout becomes a visible funnel from the water surface to the overhead cloud. The spray vortex can rise to a height of several hundred feet or more, and often creates a visible wake and an associated wave train as it moves. Finally, the funnel and spray vortex begin to dissipate as the inflow of warm air into the vortex weakens, ending the waterspout's life cycle.

=== Tornadic ===
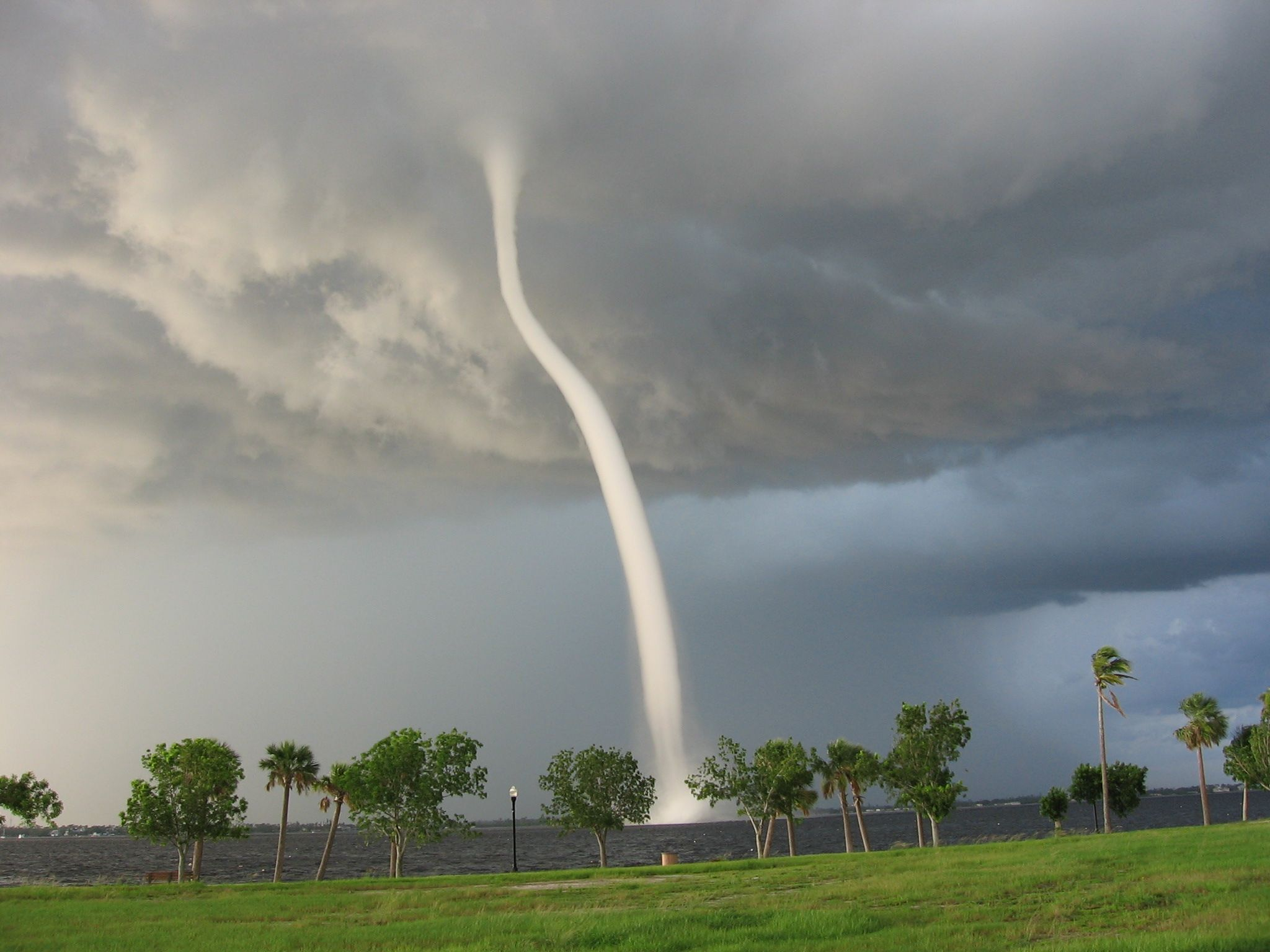
Tornadic waterspout off the coast of Punta Gorda, United States, caused by a severe thunderstorm, 15 July 2005

"Tornadic waterspouts", also accurately referred to as "tornadoes over water", are formed from mesocyclones in a manner essentially identical to land-based tornadoes in connection with severe thunderstorms, but simply occurring over water. A tornado which travels from land to a body of water would also be considered a tornadic waterspout. Since the vast majority of mesocyclonic thunderstorms in the United States occur in land-locked areas, true tornadic waterspouts are correspondingly rarer than their fair-weather counterparts in that country. However, in some areas, such as the Adriatic, Aegean and Ionian Seas, tornadic waterspouts can make up half of the total number.

=== Snowspout ===
A winter waterspout, also known as an icespout, an ice devil, or a snowspout, is a rare instance of a waterspout forming under the base of a snow squall. The term "winter waterspout" is used to differentiate between the common warm season waterspout and this rare winter season event. There are a couple of critical criteria for the formation of a winter waterspout. Very cold temperatures need to be present over a body of water, which is itself warm enough to produce fog resembling steam above the water's surface. Like the more efficient lake-effect snow events, winds focusing down the axis of long lakes enhance wind convergence and increase the likelihood of a winter waterspout developing.

The terms "snow devil" and "snownado" describe a different phenomenon: a snow vortex close to the surface with no parent cloud, similar to a dust devil.

== Impacts ==
=== Human ===
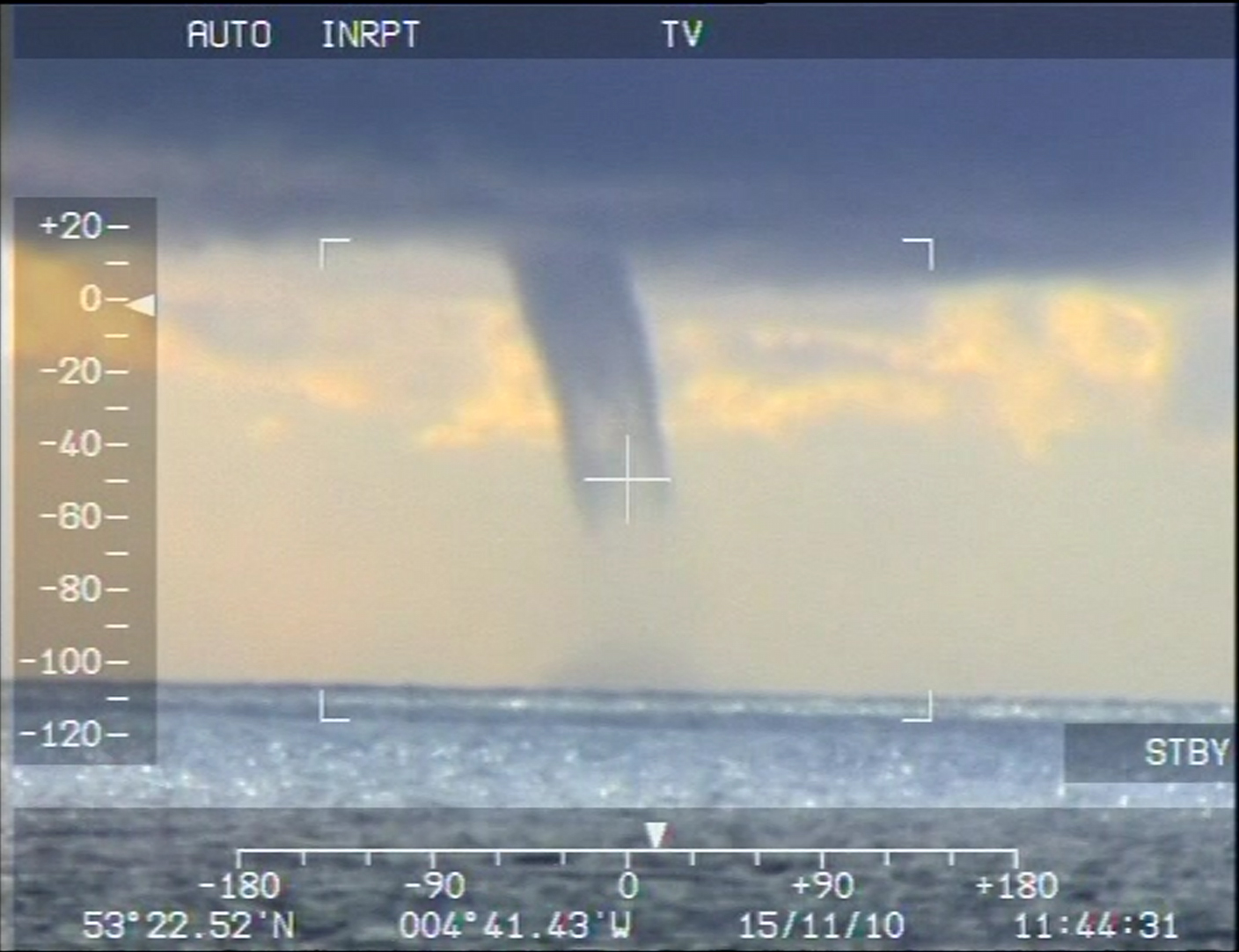
Waterspout filmed off Anglesey, Wales, by a Royal Air Force Search and Rescue crew, 15 November 2010

Waterspouts have long been recognized as serious marine hazards. Stronger waterspouts pose a threat to watercraft, aircraft and people. It is recommended to keep a considerable distance from these phenomena, and to always be on alert through weather reports. The United States National Weather Service will often issue special marine warnings when waterspouts are likely or have been sighted over coastal waters, or tornado warnings when waterspouts are expected to move onshore.

Incidents of waterspouts causing severe damage and casualties are rare; however, there have been several notable examples. The Malta tornado of 1551 was the earliest recorded occurrence of a deadly waterspout. It struck the Grand Harbour of Valletta, sinking four galleys and numerous boats, and killing hundreds of people. The 1851 Sicily tornadoes were twin waterspouts that made landfall in western Sicily, ravaging the coast and countryside before ultimately dissipating back again over the sea. In August 2024, a waterspout has been reported by some witnesses of the sinking of the large yacht Bayesian off the coast of Sicily and might have been the cause or an aggravating circumstance. Of the 22 people on the boat, seven died and 15 were rescued.

=== Natural ===
Depending on how fast the winds from a waterspout are whipping, anything that is within about 90 cm (1 yard) of the surface of the water, including fish of different sizes, frogs, and even turtles, can be lifted into the air. A waterspout can sometimes suck small animals such as fish out of the water and all the way up into the cloud. Even if the waterspout stops spinning, the fish in the cloud can be carried over land, buffeted up and down and around with the cloud's winds until its currents no longer keep the fish airborne. Depending on how far they travel and how high they are taken into the atmosphere, the fish are sometimes dead by the time they rain down. People as far as 160 km (100 miles) inland have experienced raining fish. Fish can also be sucked up from rivers, but raining fish is not a common weather phenomenon.

== Research and forecasting ==
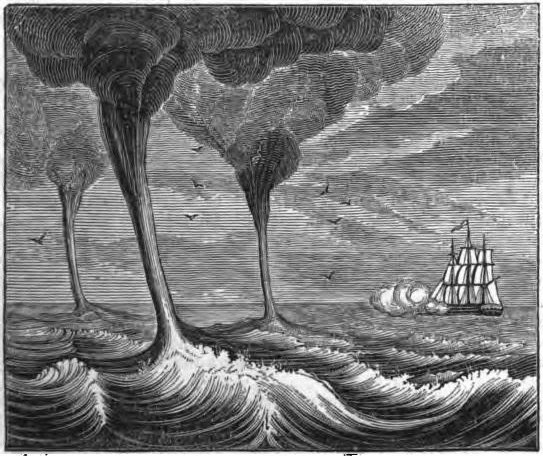
Illustration from the book The Philosophy of Storms, published in 1841

The Szilagyi Waterspout Index (SWI), developed by Canadian meteorologist Wade Szilagyi, is used to predict conditions favorable for waterspout development. The SWI ranges from −10 to +10, where values greater than or equal to zero represent conditions favorable for waterspout development.

The International Centre for Waterspout Research (ICWR) is a non-governmental organization of individuals from around the world who are interested in the field of waterspouts from a research, operational and safety perspective. Originally a forum for researchers and meteorologists, the ICWR has expanded interest and contribution from storm chasers, the media, the marine and aviation communities and from private individuals.

== Myths ==
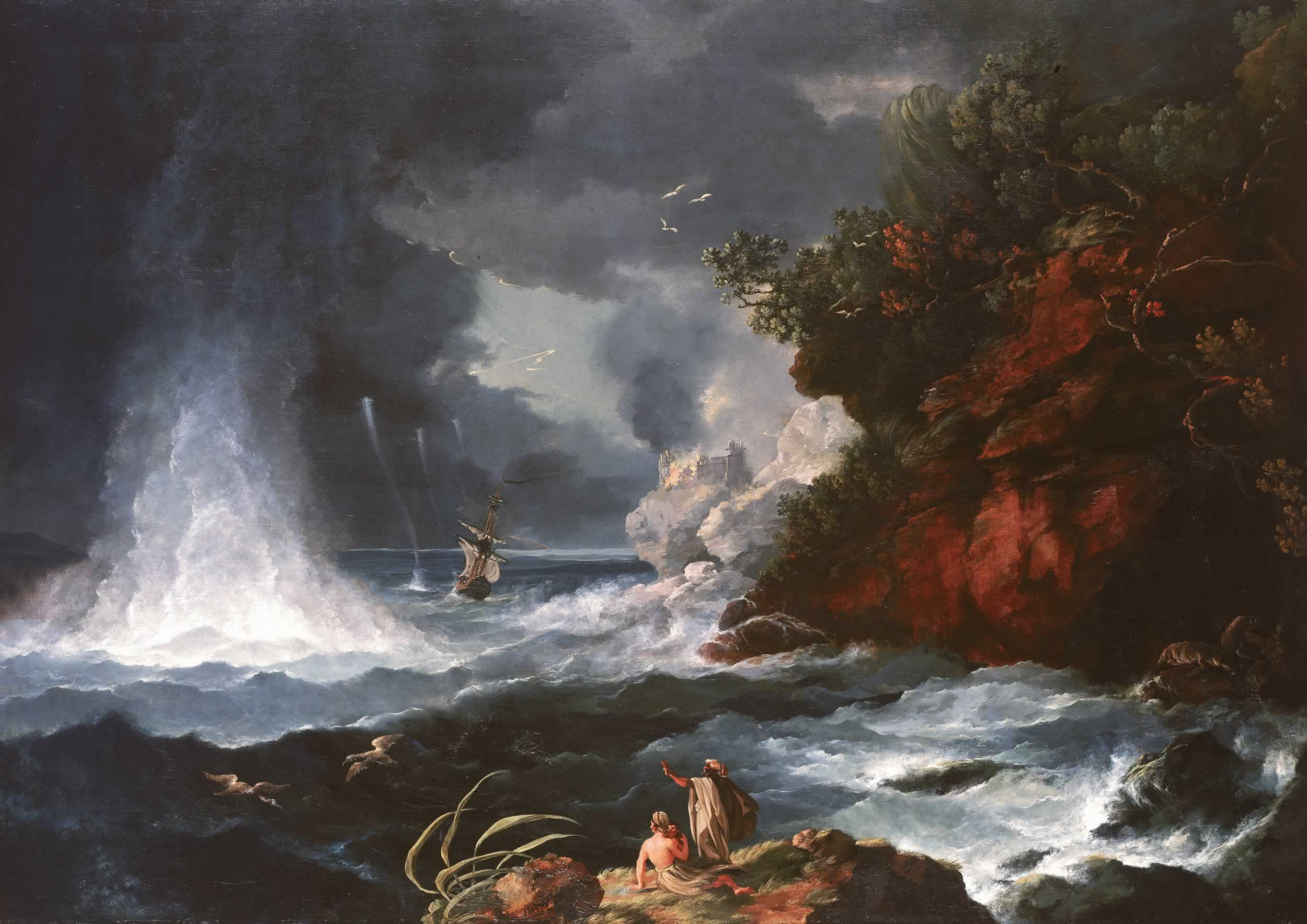
A View of Cape Stephens in Cook's Straits with Waterspout by William Hodges, 1776

There was a commonly held belief among sailors in the 18th and 19th centuries that shooting a broadside cannon volley dispersed waterspouts. Among others, Captain Vladimir Bronevskiy claims that it was a successful technique, having been an eyewitness to the dissipation of a phenomenon in the Adriatic while a midshipman aboard the frigate Venus during the 1806 campaign under Admiral Senyavin.

A waterspout has been proposed as a reason for the abandonment of the Mary Celeste.

== See also ==
- Fire whirl
- Funnel cloud
- Steam devil
- Tornadogenesis
