= Dust devil =

Type of whirlwind

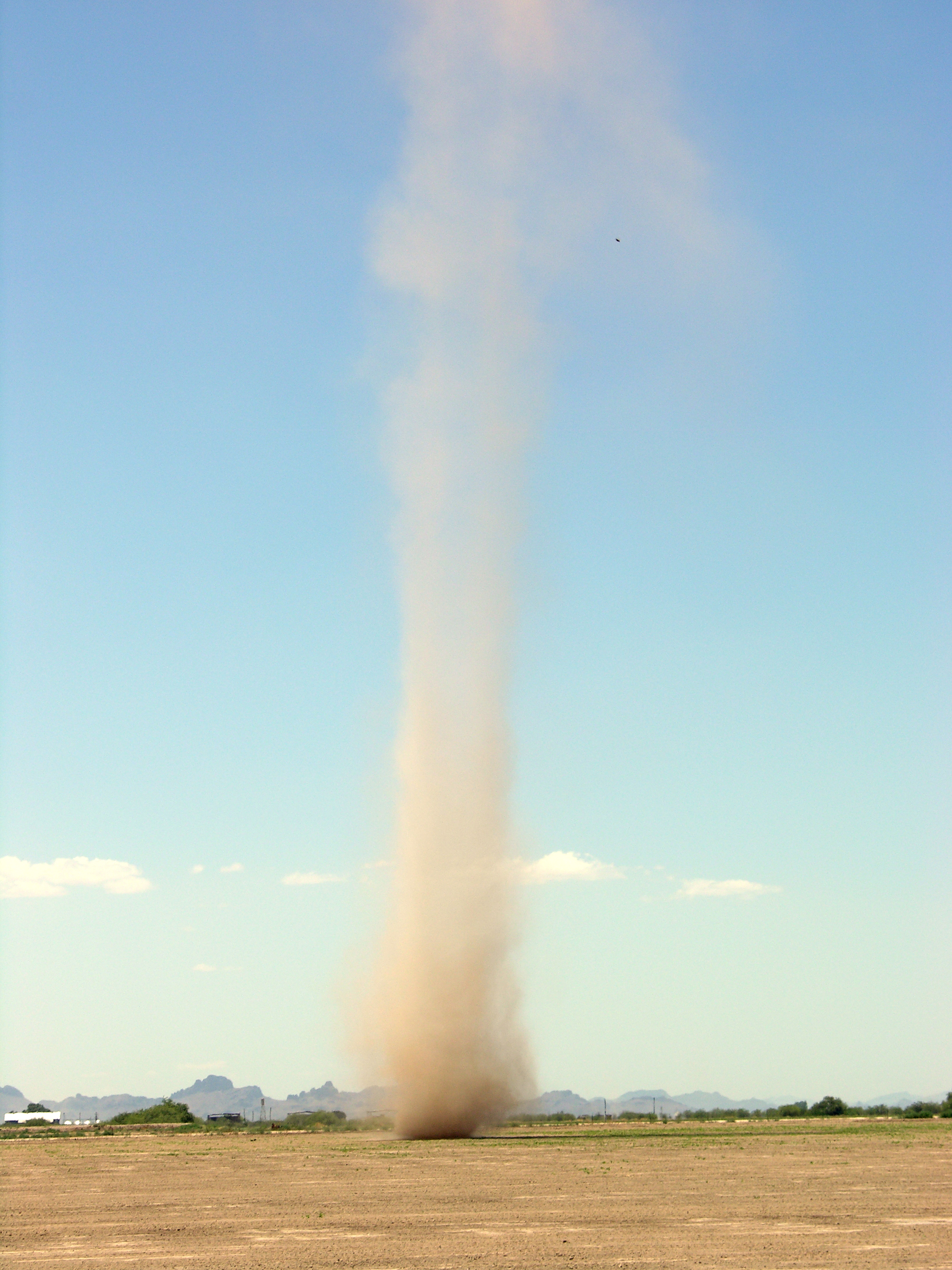
- A dust devil in Arizona, USA
- Area of occurrence: Primarily temperate and tropical regions
- Season: Most common in summer
- Effect: Dust and debris lofted into air, possibly wind damage

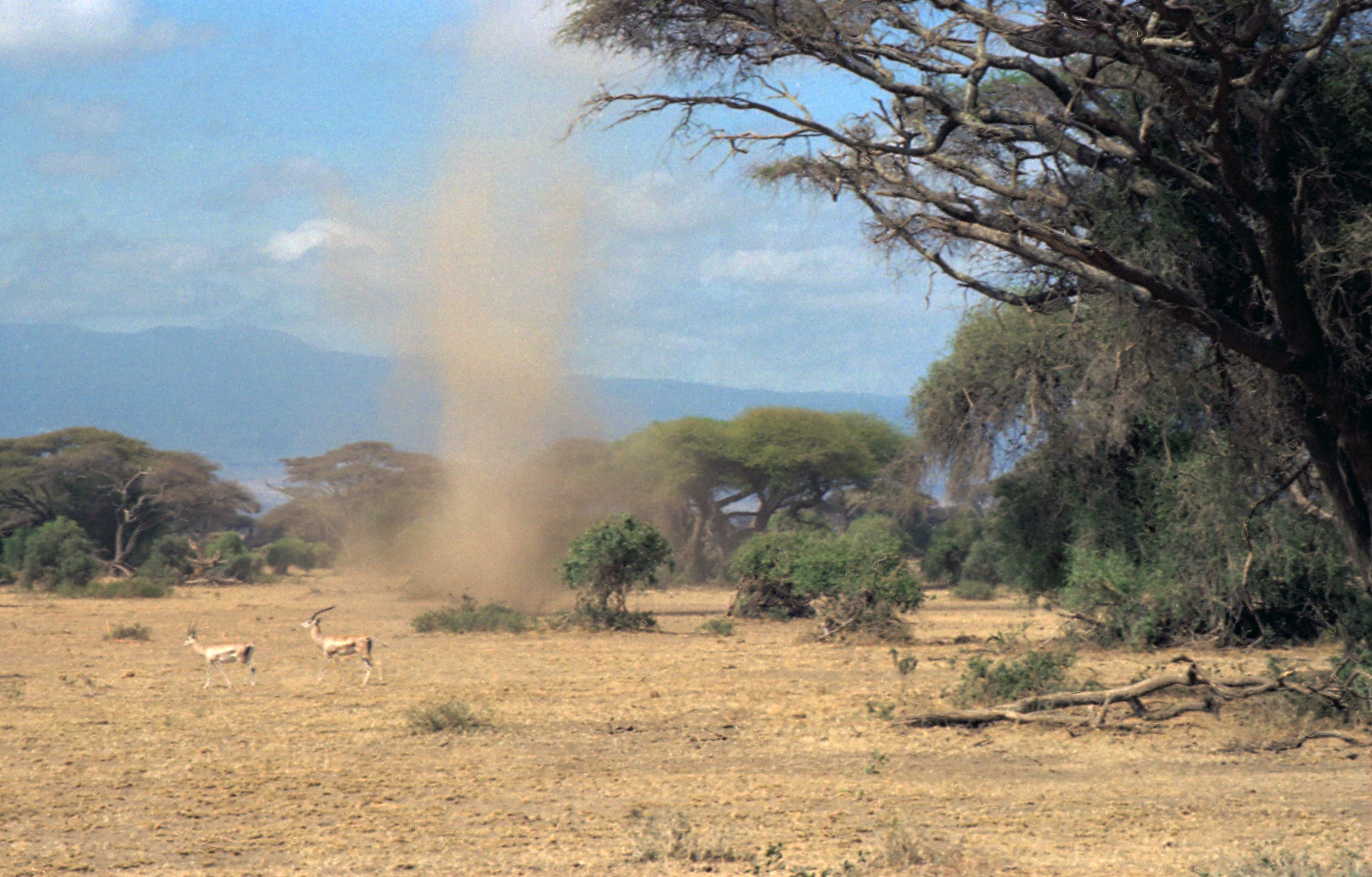
A dust devil seen in Amboseli National Park, Kenya, in 1993

A dust devil (also known regionally as a dirt devil) is a strong, well-formed, and relatively short-lived whirlwind. Its size ranges from small to large—0.5 m (18 in) and a few yards or metres tall to more than 10 m (30 ft) wide and more than 1 km (1/2 mile) tall. The primary vertical motion is upward. Dust devils are usually harmless, but can on rare occasions grow strong enough to endanger both people and property.

While they are comparable to tornadoes in that both are a weather phenomenon involving a vertically oriented rotating column of wind, dust devils typically form under sunny conditions during fair weather, rarely coming close to the intensity of a tornado.

== Formation ==
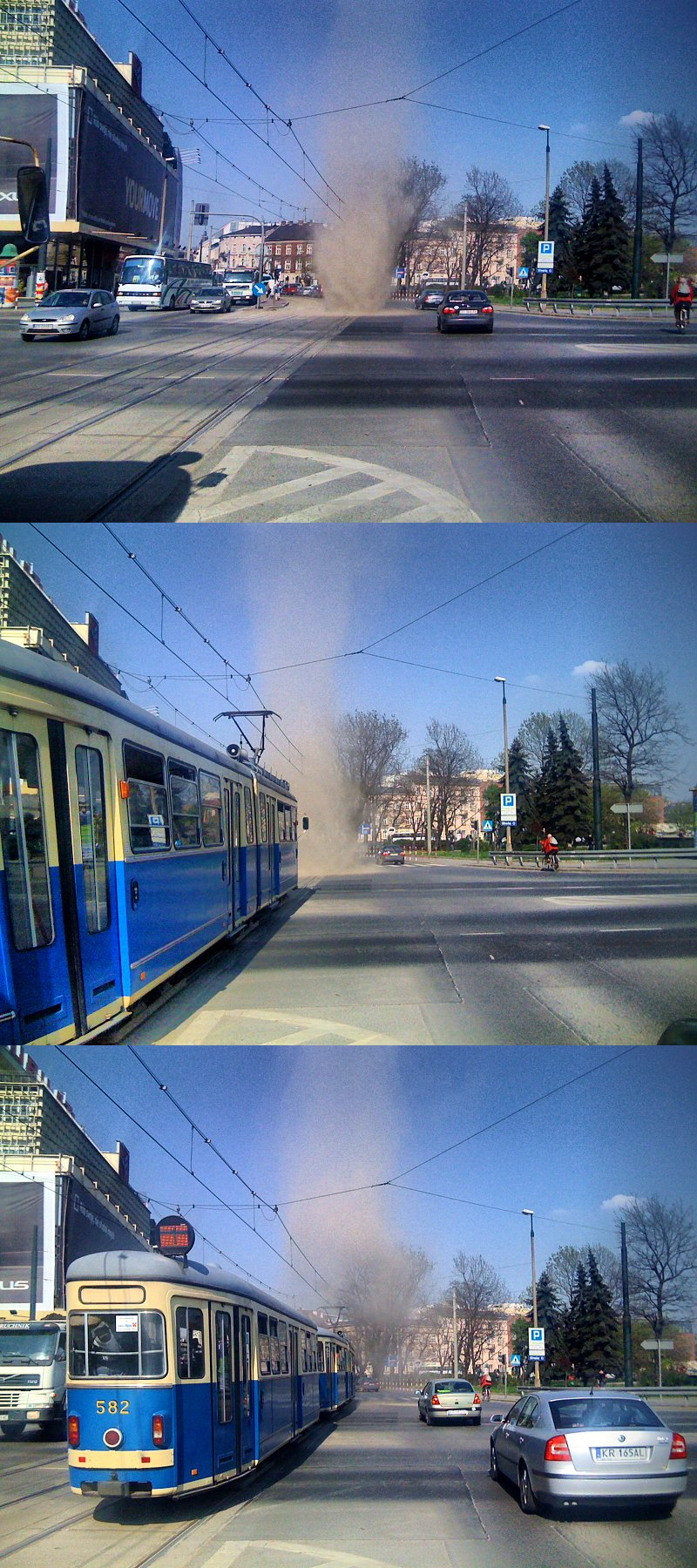
A dust devil in Kraków, Poland

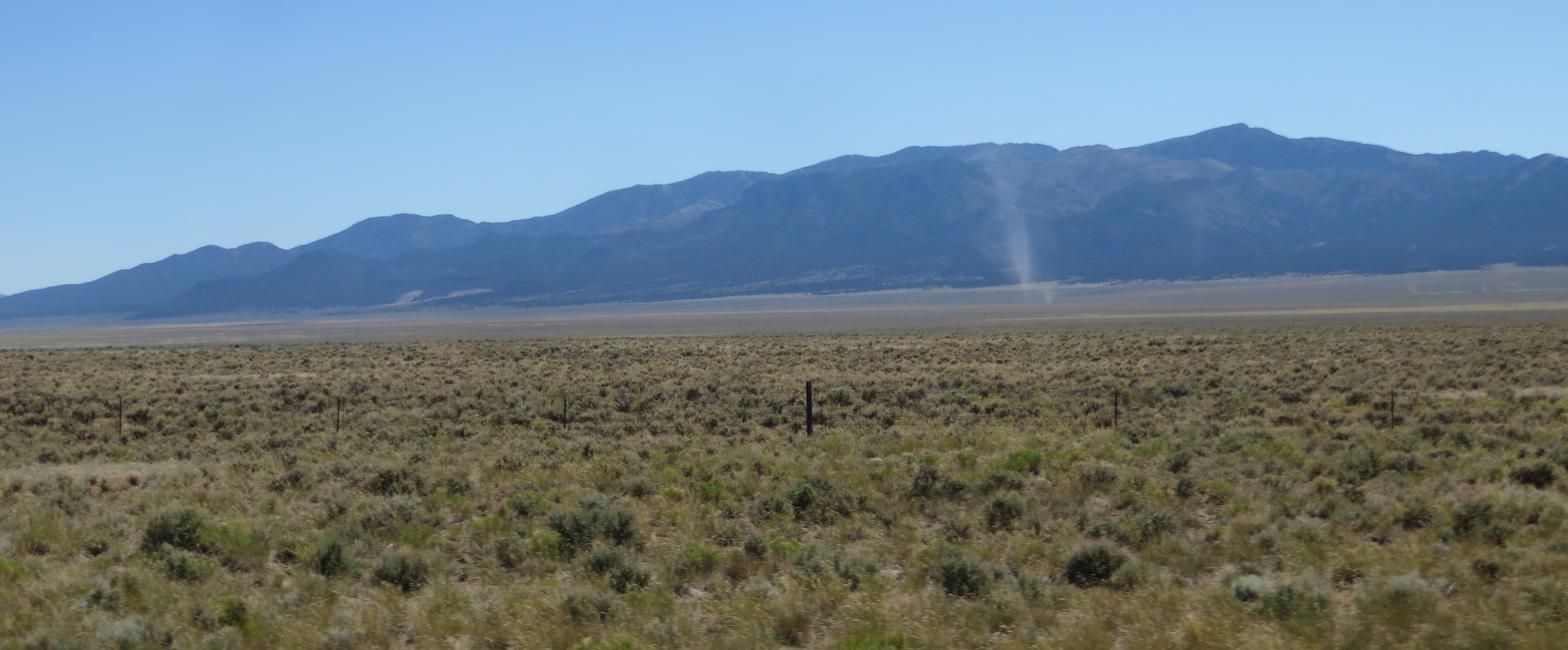
A dust devil in Steptoe Valley, Nevada, USA.

Dust devil in Czech Republic

Dust devils form when a pocket of hot air near the earth surface rises quickly through cooler air above it, forming an updraft. The hot air rises because it is less dense than the cooler air. In the right conditions, the updraft begins to rotate. The rising air stretches vertically, moving closer to the axis of rotation, which intensifies the spinning by conservation of angular momentum. The secondary flow of air causes more hot air to speed horizontally inward to the bottom of the forming vortex. As more hot air rushes toward the vortex to replace the rising air, the spinning intensifies. A fully-formed dust devil is a funnel-like chimney through which hot air moves upwards and in a circle. As the hot air rises, it cools, loses its buoyancy and eventually ceases to rise. As it rises, it displaces air which descends outside the core of the vortex. This cool air returning acts as a balance against the spinning hot-air outer wall and keeps the system stable.

The spinning and surface friction produce a forward momentum which moves the vortex horizontally. The dust devil may be sustained if it moves over nearby sources of hot surface air.

However, it dissipates in seconds if cooler air is sucked in instead of hot air. This happens when it enters an area of cooler surface air or when its movement slows down, thereby using up all available hot air.

Certain conditions increase the likelihood of dust devil formation.

- Flat barren terrain, desert or tarmac: Flat conditions increase the likelihood of the hot-air "fuel" being a near constant. Dusty or sandy conditions will cause particles to become caught up in the vortex, making the dust devil easily visible, but are not necessary for the formation of the vortex.
- Clear skies or lightly cloudy conditions: The surface needs to absorb significant amounts of solar energy to heat the air near the surface and create ideal dust devil conditions.
- Light or no wind and cool atmospheric temperature: The underlying factor for sustainability of a dust devil is the extreme difference in temperature between the near-surface air and the atmosphere. Windy conditions will destabilize the spinning effect of a dust devil.

== Intensity and duration ==
Dust devils are usually small and weak, often less than 0.9 m (3 feet) in diameter with maximum winds averaging about 72 km/h (45 mph), and they often dissipate less than a minute after forming. On rare occasions, a dust devil can grow very large and intense, sometimes reaching a diameter of up to 90 m (300 feet) with winds in excess of 97 km/h (60 mph) and can last for upwards of 20 minutes before dissipating. Because of their small diameter, Coriolis force is not significant in the dust devil itself so dust devils with anticyclonic rotation do occur.

== Hazards ==
Large dust devil in Mexico

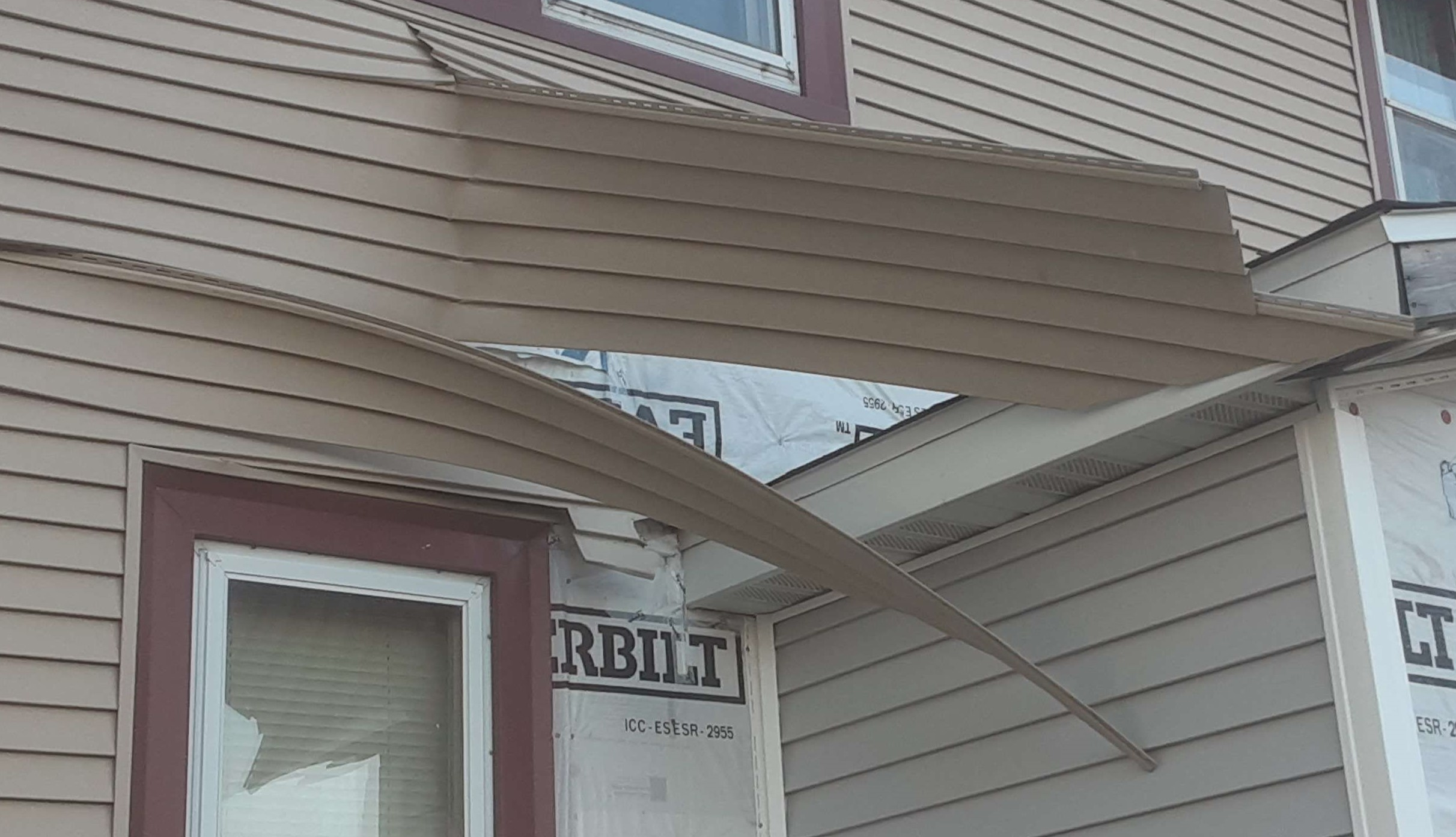
Slight damage to the side of a home from a strong dust devil in Iowa, USA

Dust devils typically do not cause injuries, but rare, severe dust devils have caused damage and even deaths in the past. One such dust devil struck the Coconino County Fairgrounds in Flagstaff, Arizona, on 14 September 2000, causing extensive damage to several temporary tents, stands and booths, as well as some permanent fairgrounds structures. Several injuries were reported, but there were no fatalities. Based on the degree of damage left behind, it is estimated that the dust devil produced winds as high as 120 km/h (75 mph), which is equivalent to an EF0 tornado. On 19 May 2003, a dust devil lifted the roof off a two-story building in Lebanon, Maine, causing it to collapse and kill a man inside. On 18 June 2008, a woman near Casper, Wyoming was killed when a dust devil caused a small scorer's shed at a youth baseball field to flip on top of her. She had been trying to shelter from the dust devil by going behind the shed. At East El Paso, Texas in 2010, three children in an inflatable jump house were picked up by a dust devil and lifted over 3 m (10 ft), travelling over a fence and landing in a backyard three houses away. In Commerce City, Colorado in 2018, a powerful dust devil hurtled two porta-potties into the air; no one was injured. In 2019, a large dust devil in Yucheng county, Henan province, China killed 2 children and injured 18 children and 2 adults when an inflatable jump house was lifted into the air.

a strong dust devil forms in a Firing range in Qalat

Dust devils have been implicated in around 100 aircraft accidents. While many incidents have been simple taxiing problems, a few have had fatal consequences. Dust devils are also considered major hazards among skydivers and paragliding pilots as they can cause a parachute or a paraglider to collapse with little to no warning, at altitudes considered too low to cut away, and contribute to the serious injury or death of parachutists. Such was the case on 1 June 1996, when a dust devil caused a skydiver's parachute to collapse about 9 m (30 feet) above the ground. He later died from the injuries he sustained. Dust devils can also contribute to wildfires. One case occurred in Engebæk, Billund Municipality, Denmark in 1868 where a dust devil tossed tuft into a heater, causing a wildfire that possibly extended from 10,000 to 50,000 hectares (25,000 to 124,000 acres) or more.

== Electrical activities ==
Dust devils, even small ones, can produce radio noise and electrical fields exceeding 10,000 V/m. A dust devil picks up small dirt and dust particles, which become electrically charged through contact or frictional charging (triboelectrification) as they whirl around. The whirling charged particles also create a magnetic field that fluctuates between 3 and 30 times each second.

These electric fields may assist the vortices in lifting material from the ground to the atmosphere. Field experiments indicate that a dust devil can lift 1 gram per second per square metre (10 pounds per second per acre) of dust off the ground over which it passes. A large dust devil measuring about 100 m (330 feet) across at its base can lift about 15 tonnes (17 short tons) of dust into the air in 30 min. Giant dust storms that sweep across the world's deserts contribute 8% of the mineral dust in the atmosphere each year during the handful of storms that occur. In comparison, the significantly smaller dust devils that twist across the deserts during the summer lift about three times as much dust, thus having a greater combined impact on the dust content of the atmosphere. When this occurs, they are often called sand pillars.

== Martian dust devils ==
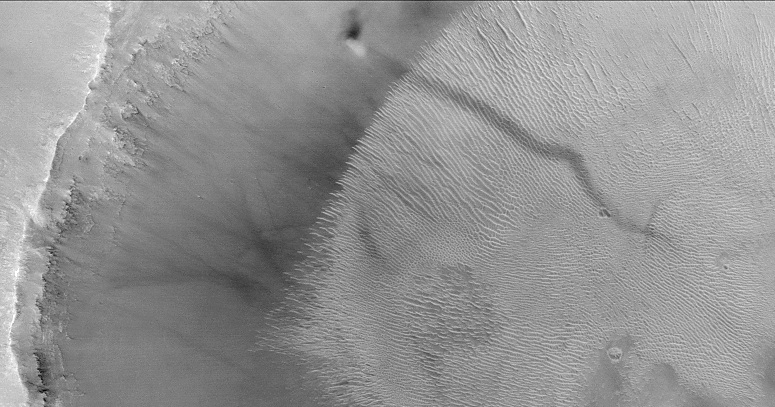
Dust devil on Mars (MGS)

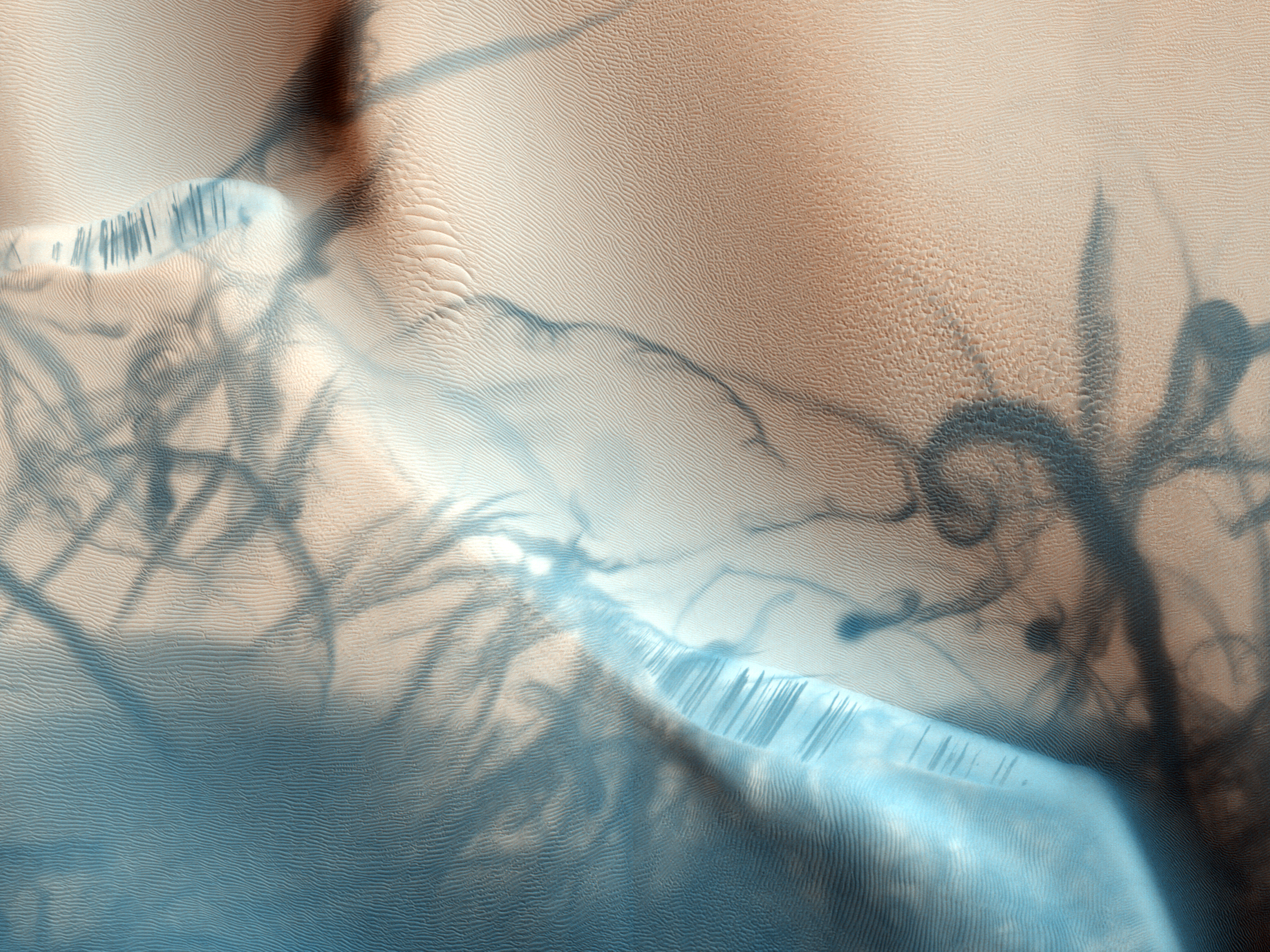
Dust devils cause twisting dark trails on the Martian surface.

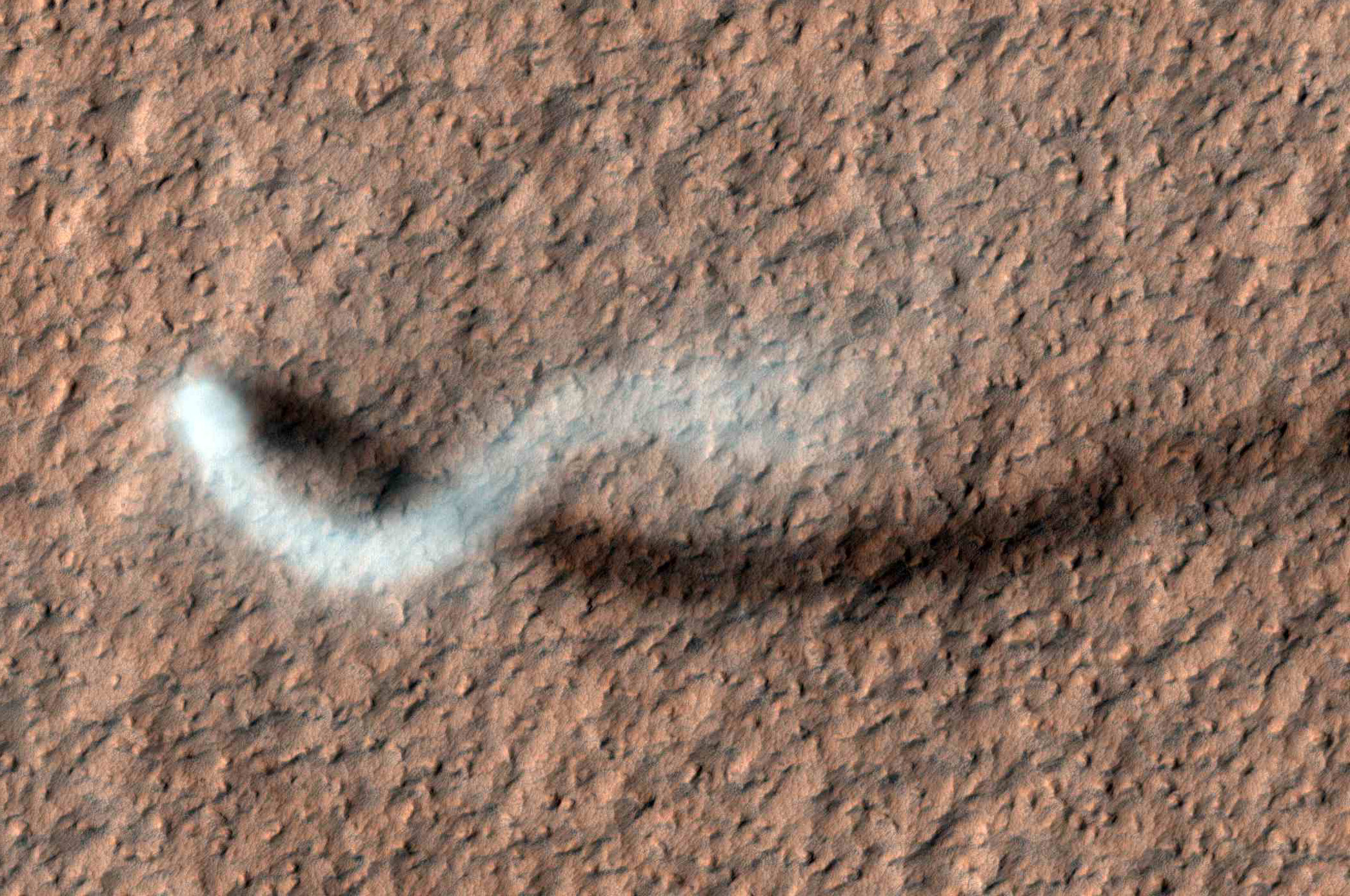
Serpent Dust Devil of Mars (MRO)

A dust devil captured by the Curiosity rover in 2020

Martian dust devils are convective atmospheric vortices that occur on the surface of Mars. They were discovered from data reported by NASA's Viking probes, and have been photographed by orbiting satellites and surface rovers in subsequent missions.

Although comparable to terrestrial dust devils in formation and appearance, Martian dust devils can be many times larger than ones found on Earth. They can be powerful enough to pose a threat to rovers and other technology, although some documented encounters have actually benefitted rovers by cleaning them of dust.

== Alternate names ==
In Australia, a dust devil is more commonly known as "Willy willy". In Ireland, dust devils are known as "sí gaoithe" or "fairy wind".

== Related phenomena ==
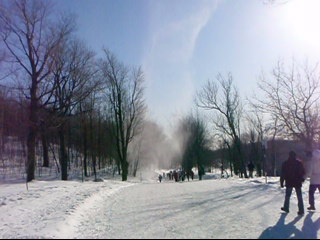
Snow whirlwind or devil, similar to a dust devil, seen on Mount Royal in Montreal, Canada

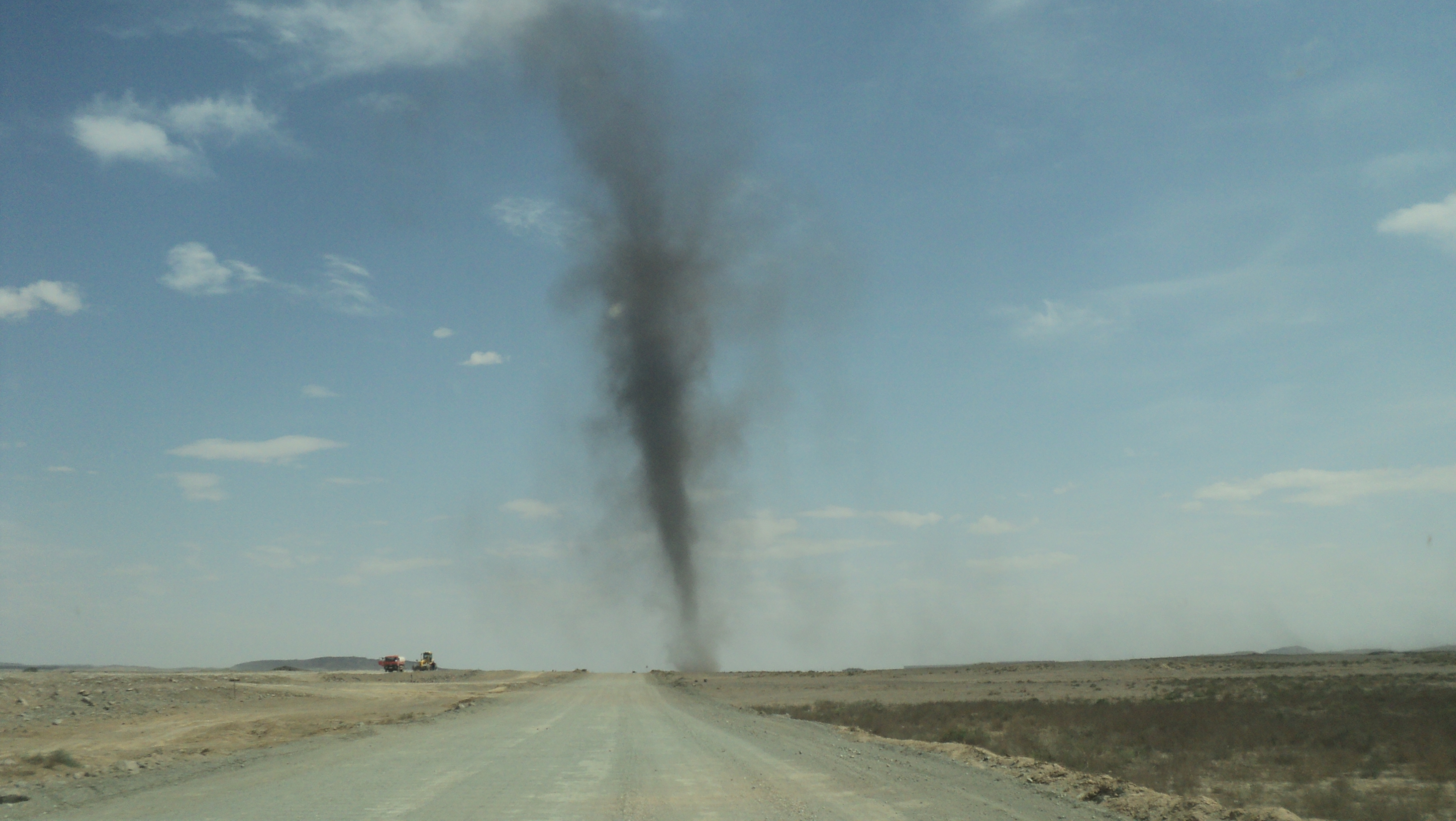
Coal devil in Mongolia

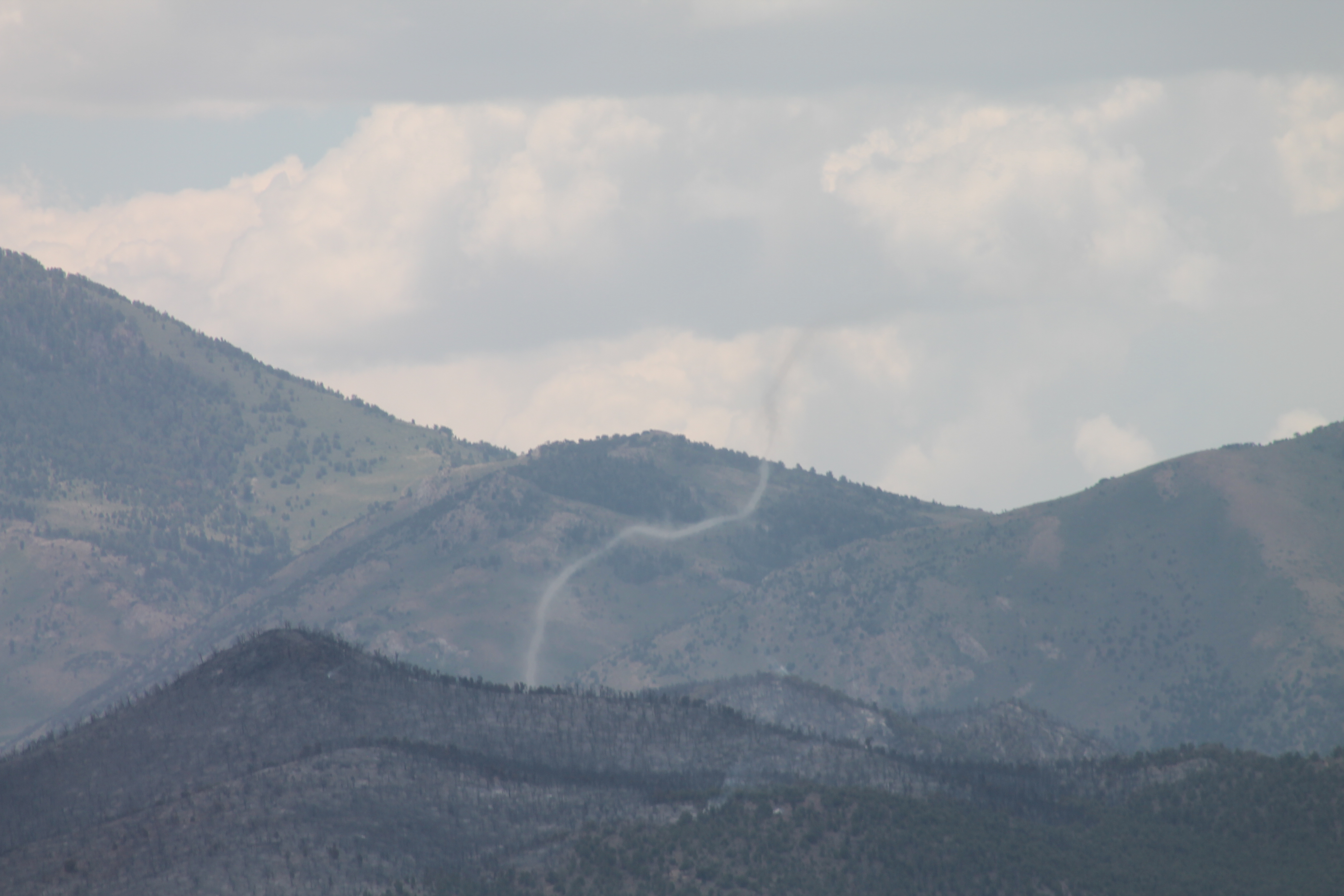
An ash devil. The fire was in the Schell Creek and Antelope Mountain ranges.

=== Ash devils ===
Hot cinders underneath freshly deposited ash in recently burned areas may sometimes generate numerous dust devils. The lighter weight and the darker color of the ash may create dust devils that are visible hundreds of feet into the air.

Ash devils form similar to dust devils and are often seen on unstable days in burn scar areas of recent fires.

Coal devils are common at the coal town of Tsagaan Khad in South Gobi Province, Mongolia. They occur when dust devils pick up large amounts of stockpiled coal. Their dark color makes them resemble some tornadoes.

=== Fire whirls ===
Fire whirls or swirls, sometimes called fire devils or fire tornadoes, can be seen during intense fires in combustible building structures or, more commonly, in forest or bush fires. A fire whirl is a vortex-shaped formation of burning gases being released from the combustible material. The genesis of the vortex is probably similar to a dust devil's. As distinct from the dust devil, it is improbable that the height reached by the fire gas vortex is greater than the visible height of the vertical flames because of turbulence in the surrounding gases that inhibit creation of a stable boundary layer between the rotating/rising gases relative to the surrounding gases.

=== Hay devils ===
A "hay devil" is a gentle whirlwind that forms in the warm air above fields of freshly-cut hay. A vortex forms from a column of hot air rising from the ground on calm, sunny days, tossing and swirling stalks and clumps of hay harmlessly through the air, often to the delight of children and onlookers.

=== Snow devils ===
The same conditions can produce a snow whirlwind, snow devil, or sometimes referred to as a "snownado", although differential heating is more difficult in snow-covered areas.

=== Steam devils ===
Steam devils are a small vortex column of saturated air of varying height but small diameter forming when cold air lies over a much warmer body of water or saturated surface. They are also often observed in the steam rising from power plants.
