= List of science fiction tropes =

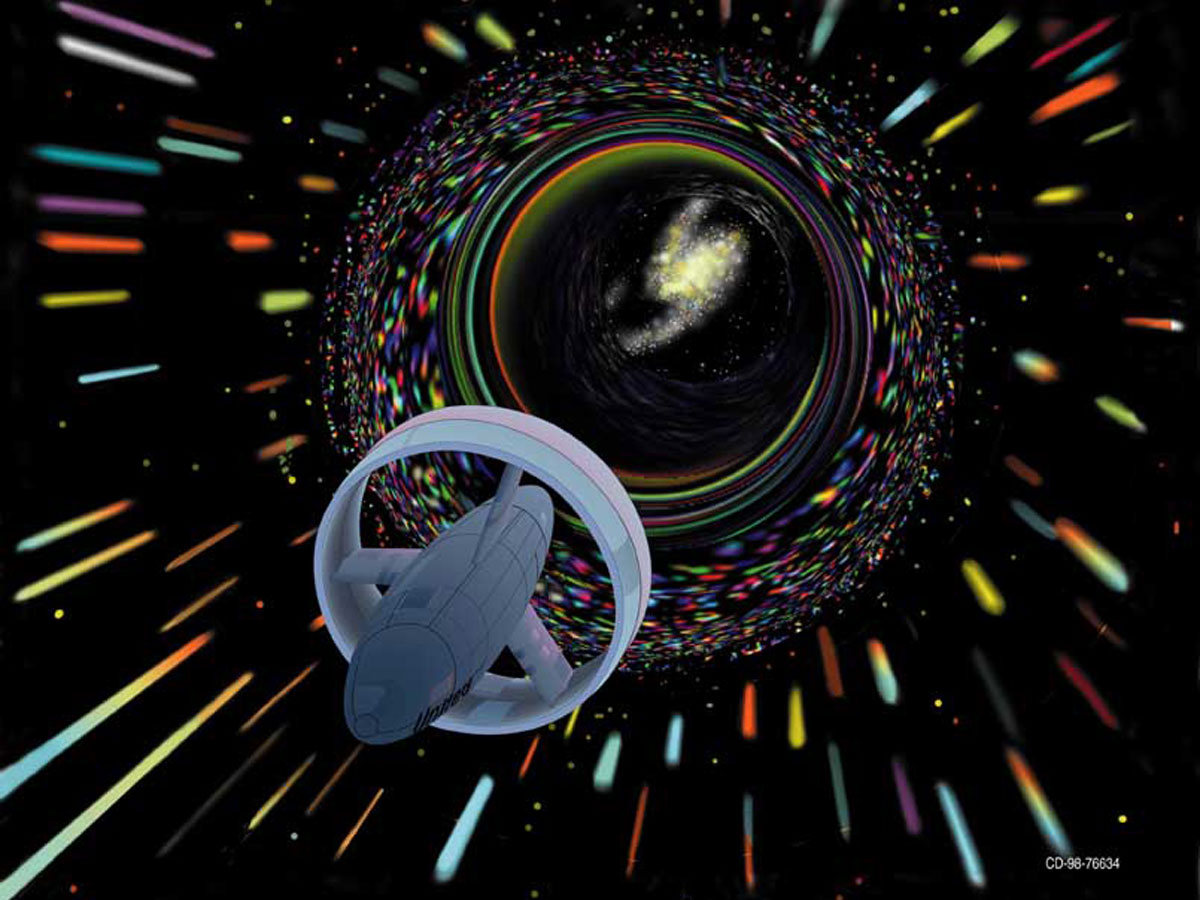
While science fiction stories have many themes, exploration and discovery in space is a recurring focus.

The following is a list of articles about common and recurring tropes, themes, or elements in science fiction.

== Overarching themes ==
- First contact with aliens
- Artificial intelligence
  - Machine rule/Cybernetic revolt/AI takeover
- Cataclysm or disaster threatening the future of humanity
  - Apocalyptic and post-apocalyptic fiction: worldwide disruption and new societies that develop after the event
- Extraterrestrials
- History
  - Alternate history
  - Scientific prediction of the future (e.g. psychohistory)
- Human fears: List of science fiction horror films
- Language
  - Alien languages (e.g. Klingon, Huttese)
  - The Sapir–Whorf Hypothesis (e.g. Babel 17, The Languages of Pao)
  - Universal translators (e.g. Babel fish)
- Military/conflicts
  - Interstellar war
  - Weapons in science fiction
- Parallel worlds or multiverse
- Philosophies and philosophical ideas
- Sex and sexuality
  - Gender
  - LGBT themes
  - Reproduction and pregnancy
- Simulated reality and consciousness
- Social science fiction
- Technological singularity
- Themes of fantasy fiction

== Beings and entities ==
- Artificial intelligences
  - Androids and Gynoid
  - Artificial life
  - Biological robot
  - Cyborgs
  - Robots and humanoid robots
  - Replicants
  - Simulated consciousness
- Stock characters:
  - The Absent-minded professor
  - The Golem
  - The Mad Scientist
  - Redshirt
  - Space Pirate
  - Super Soldier
- Clones
- Dinosaurs
- Extraterrestrial life
  - Hypothetical types of biochemistry
  - Alien invasion
  - Astrobiology
  - God-like aliens
    - Principles of non-interference (e.g. Prime Directive)
    - Message from space
- Living planets (both sentient and non-sentient)
- Hive minds
- Infomorphs—memories, characters, and consciences of persons being uploaded to a computer or storage media
- Mutants
- Shapeshifters
- Superhumans
- Superorganisms
- Symbionts
- UFOs
- Uplifting—using technology to "raise" non-human animals to human evolutionary levels
  - Ancient astronauts
  - Progressorship

== Body and mind alterations ==
- Body hacking (biohacking, grinder (biohacker community)), Biopunk (amateur biotechnicians)
- Artificial organs
- Improved or added senses
  - X-ray vision
- Cloning
- Exocortex
- Genetic engineering
  - Super race
- Intelligence amplification
- Invisibility
- Life extension, Biological immortality, Universal immortalism and immortality
  - Cryonics
  - Digital immortality
  - Mind uploading
  - Organ transplantation
  - Organlegging
- Prosthetics
- Memory
  - Memory erasure, editing
  - Memory sharing
    - Group mind
  - Mind control
  - Mind swap
  - Mind uploading
  - Neural implants to directly interface with machinery
- Psi powers and psychic phenomena
  - Clairvoyance
  - Precognition
  - Pyrokinesis
  - Retrocognition
  - Telepathy
  - Telekinesis
- Parasitism
- Psychedelia
- Resizing (size-changing, miniaturization, magnification, shrinking, and enlargement)
- Shapeshifting
- Superhuman strength
- Teleportation
- Transhumanism, Posthumanism

== Habitats ==
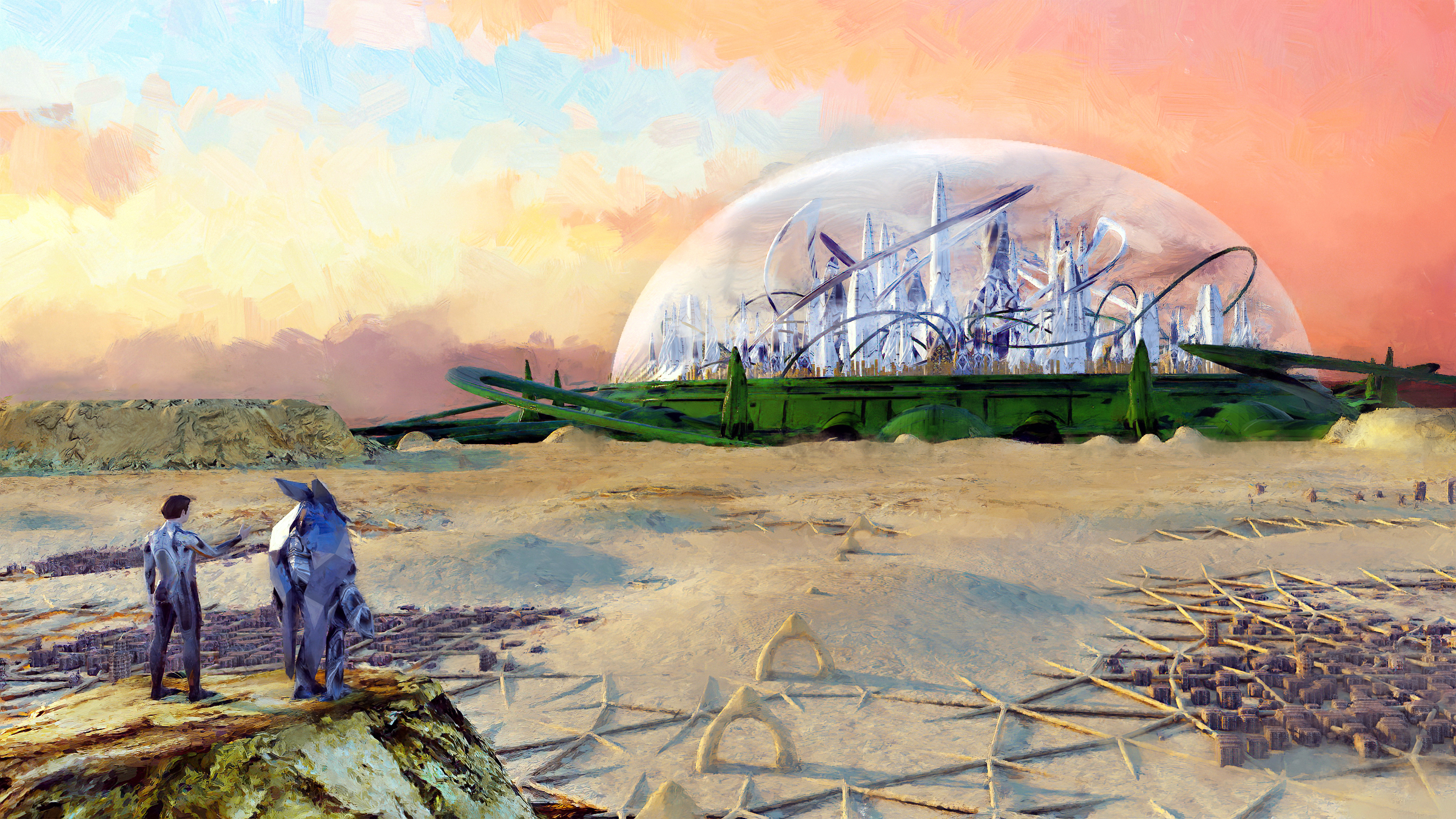
A domed city

- Artificial worlds
- Alien Zoo—a zoo where humans are kept as exhibits
- Arcologies—enormous habitats (hyperstructures) of extremely high human population density
- Cyberspace—the new, virtual territory of societal interaction
- Domed city
- Floating city
- Future of the Earth
  - Climate change—science fiction dealing with effects of anthropogenic climate change and global warming at the end of the Holocene era
- Megacity
- Pastoral science fiction—science fiction set in rural, bucolic, or agrarian worlds, either on Earth or on Earth-like planets, in which advanced technologies are downplayed.
- Seasteading and ocean colonization
  - Pirate utopia
- Reality Television
- Space colonization
  - Colonization of the Moon
  - Ecumenopolis
  - Pantropy
  - Other planets
    - Desert planet
      - Mars
  - Terraformed planets
- Space stations and habitats
- Underground city

== Political themes ==
- Adhocracy
- Anarcho-capitalism
- Capitalism
  - Evil corporation
  - Megacorporation
  - Neo-feudalism
- Cognitive liberty
- Dystopias and utopias
  - Environmental pollution
  - Overpopulation
  - Technological utopianism
  - Totalitarianism
- Galactic empires
- Government by algorithm
- Legal personality
- Libertarianism
- Mass surveillance
- Mind reading and mind control
- National security state
- Post-scarcity economy
- Socialism
  - Nanosocialism
- Technoethics
  - Bioethics
- Technophobia
- Techno-progressivism
- Terrorism
  - Bio-terrorism
  - Eco-terrorism
- Totalitarianism vs. Libertarianism

== Technologies ==
- Artificial gravity
- Artificial intelligence
- Asteroid mining
- Astronomical engineering
- Brain–computer interface
- Cloaking device
- Emerging technologies
- Robots
- Self-replicating machines
- Simulated reality
- Star lifting and stellar engineering
- Stasis device
- Mecha
- Megascale engineering and planetary engineering
  - Megastructures
  - Dyson sphere
- Molecular manufacturing and Nanotechnology
  - Molecular assembler
- Alien technology
- Virtual reality, mixed reality, augmented reality
  - Infosphere
  - Metaverse
- Weapons in science fiction

== Travel ==
- Accidental travel
- Colonization of other planets, moons, asteroids, etc.
  - Embryo space colonization
  - Generation ship
  - Interstellar ark
  - Uploaded astronaut
  - Terraforming
- Space exploration
  - Interstellar travel/Starships
    - Faster-than-light travel and communications
      - Hyperspace
      - Slipstream
      - Warp drives
      - Wormholes
      - Ansibles
    - Close to light speed
      - Bussard ramjets
      - Ursula K. Le Guin's NAFAL ships, and the Twin paradox
    - Much slower than light
      - Generation ship
      - Sleeper ship
  - Space stations
- Teleportation
  - Teletransporter
- Time travel
  - Alternate history: time travel can be used as a plot device to explore parallel universes. While alternate history has its own category (see above), it often occurs in time travel stories as well.
  - Alternate future
  - Time loop
- Travel to the Earth's center
  - Hollow Earth

== See also ==
- Biology in fiction
- Fantasy tropes
- Outline of science fiction
- Protoscience
