= Station (New Zealand agriculture) =

Large sheep- or cattle-grazing farm in New Zealand

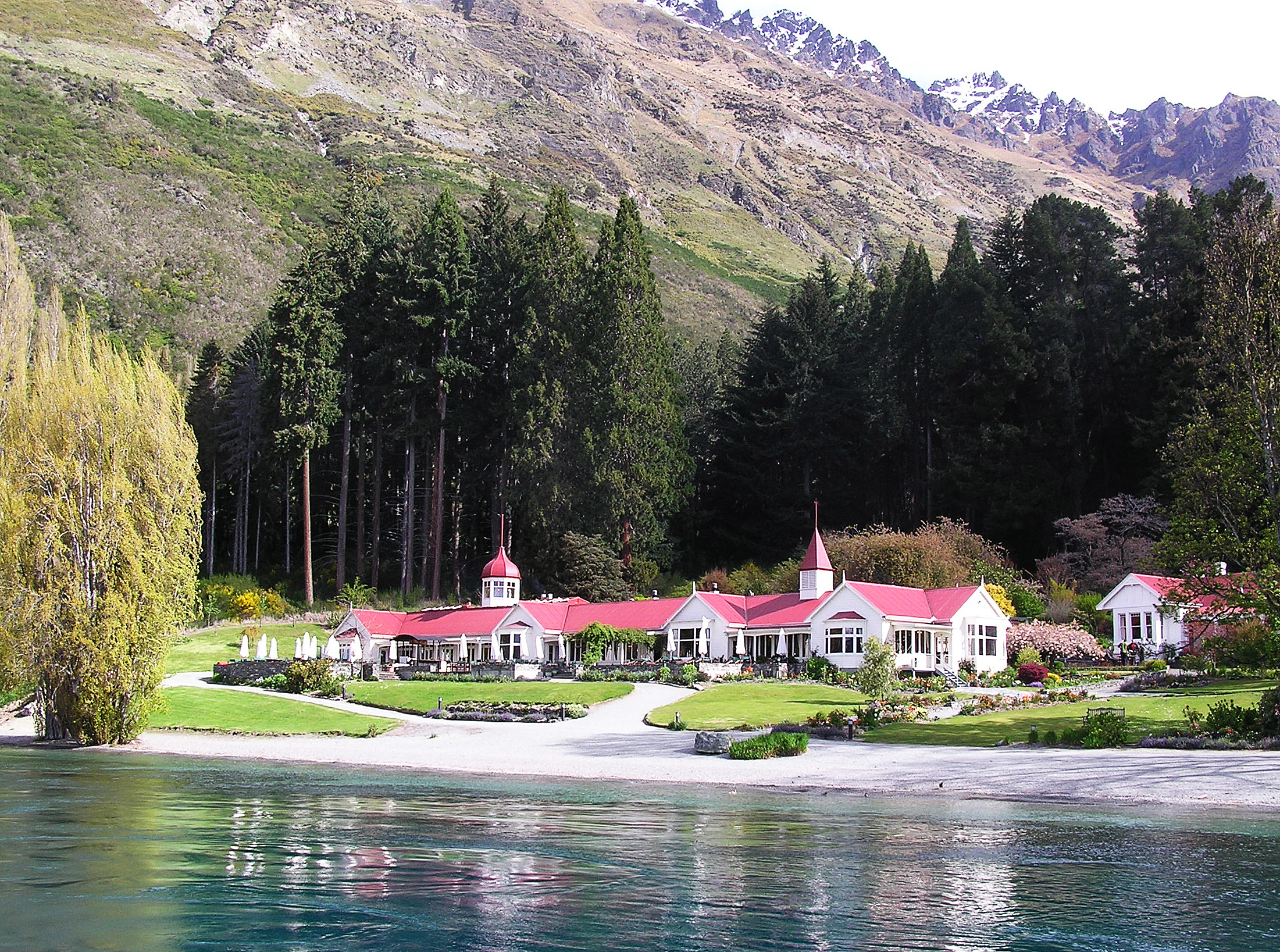
Walter Peak Station, opposite Queenstown on the shore of Lake Wakatipu.

A station or run, in the context of New Zealand agriculture, is a large farm dedicated to the grazing of sheep and cattle. The use of the word for the farm or farm buildings date back to the mid-nineteenth century. The owner of a station is called a runholder.

Some of the stations in the South Island have been subject to the voluntary tenure review process. As part of this process the government has been buying out all or part of the leases. Poplars Station in the Lewis Pass area was purchased in part by the government in 2003. The Nature Heritage Fund was used to purchase 4000 ha for $1.89 million. Birchwood Station was bought in 2005 to form part of the Ahuriri Conservation Park. St James Station was purchased by the Government in 2008.

== Notable stations ==
- Ākitio Station, formerly a 50,000 acres (200 km^{2}) property located in the Southern North Island province of Wairarapa and host to the touring English Cricket team in the 20th century.
- Castle Hill Station, located on State Highway 73; location of a popular rock-climbing area.
- Double Hill Station, located up the Rakaia River.
- Erewhon Station, named after a fictitious place (based on Mesopotamia Station) in Samuel Butler's book "Erewhon".
- Glenaray Station, near Waikaia in northern Southland.
- Marainanga Station, Southern North Island, formerly 38,000 acres (150 km^{2}) – famously associated to Ocean Racing – and the Condor maxi yacht campaigns of the 1970s/1980s; and connected to the 1908 foundation of the UK's Stoke Park Club.
- Mesopotamia Station, associated with 19th century novelist Samuel Butler.
- Molesworth Station, at over 1,800 square kilometres (440,000 acres), New Zealand's largest farm. Now administered by the Department of Conservation.
- Mt Nicholas Station, on the western shores of Lake Wakatipu is 40,000 hectares and runs 29,000 Merino sheep and 2,300 Hereford cattle.
- St James Station, purchased by the Government in 2008 to be conservation land.
- Walter Peak Station, founded in 1860, is a 25,758 hectare working high country sheep station on the southern shore of Lake Wakatipu. It runs approximately 18,000 Merino and Perendale sheep and about 800 beef cows.

Glenfalloch Station, situated in the Headwaters of the Rakaia River, a working sheep and beef farm operating a small conference venue.

== References in literature ==
- Erewhon – Samuel Butler's satire of Victorian society built around his experiences on a New Zealand sheep station but put forward as a location in a fictional country. Butler also wrote A First Year in the Canterbury Settlement
- Station Life in New Zealand and Station Amusements in New Zealand by Lady Barker.
- Tutira: The Story of a New Zealand Sheep Station – Herbert Guthrie-Smith documents the effect of farming on the environment based on his first hand experiences as station owner.
- A river rules my life – Mona Anderson wrote this classic book about life on a high country station.
- High Country Family by Betty Dick, wife of MP Allan Dick

== See also ==
- Station (Australian agriculture)
- Ranch, the American equivalent
