= Butlerian =

Butlerian is an eponymous adjective that may refer to:

- Judith Butler (born 1956), American philosopher involved with feminism, queer theory, and ethics
- Samuel Butler (1835–1902), iconoclastic Victorian author
- Octavia E. Butler (1947–2006), American science fiction author in references to the themes in her books
