= Erewhon =

1872 utopian novel by Samuel Butler

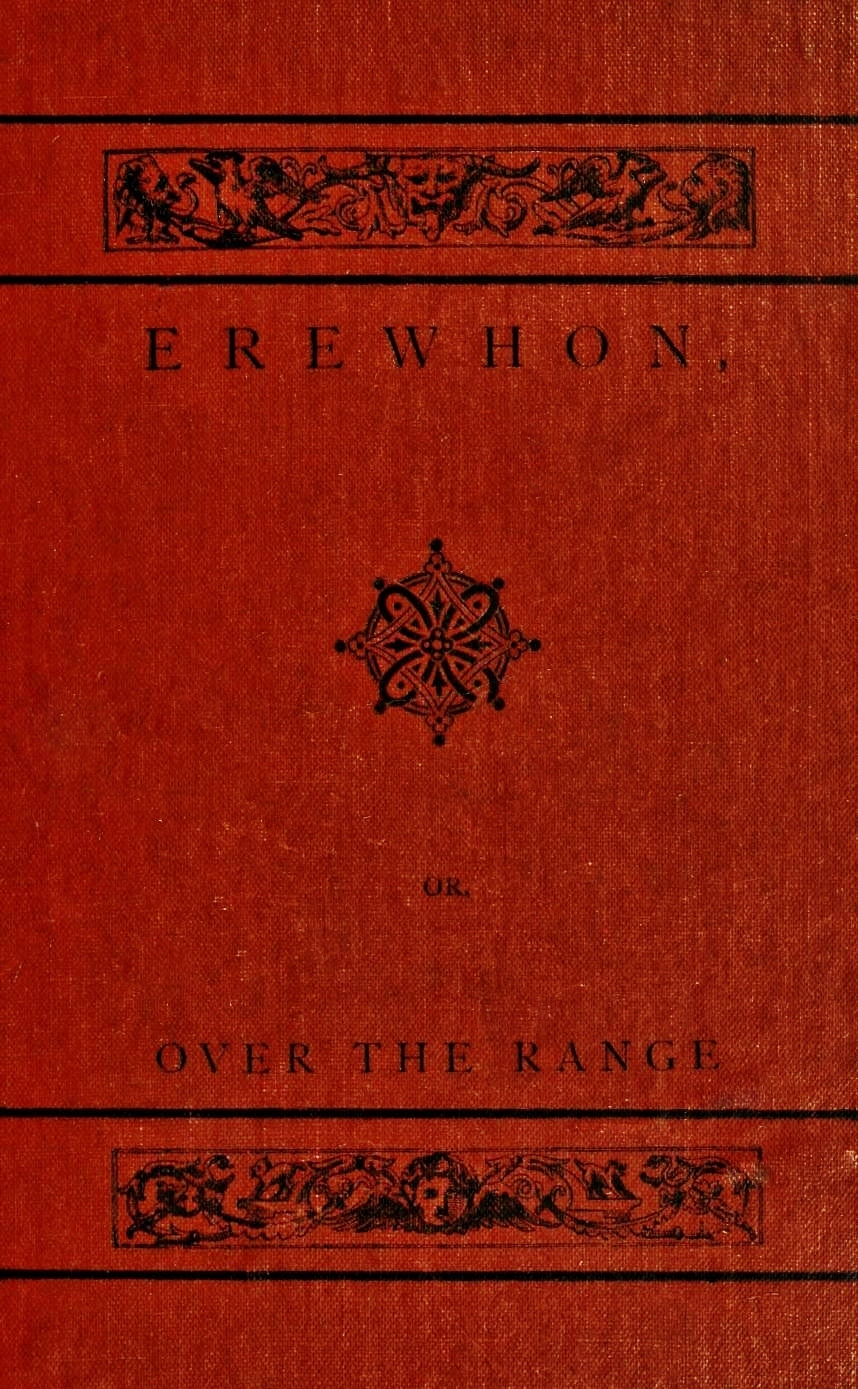
- First-edition cover
- Author: Samuel Butler
- Language: English
- Genre: Utopian fiction, Satire, Science fiction
- Publisher: Trübner and Ballantyne
- Publication date: 1872
- Publication place: United Kingdom
- Pages: 246
- OCLC: 2735354
- Dewey Decimal: 823.8
- LC Class: PR4349.B7 E7 1872 c. 1
- Followed by: Erewhon Revisited
- Text: Erewhon at Wikisource

Map of part of New Zealand to illustrate Erewhon and Erewhon Revisited

Erewhon, or Over the Range (/ˈɛr.ɛ.hwɒn/, ERR-eh-hwon) is a utopian novel by English writer Samuel Butler, first published in 1872, set in a fictional country discovered and explored by the protagonist. The book is a satire on Victorian society. Its name is an anagram of the word “nowhere”, with the same meaning as “utopia” (nowhere).

The first few chapters of the novel dealing with the discovery of Erewhon are based on Butler's own experiences in New Zealand; as a young man, he had worked there as a sheep farmer on Mesopotamia Station for four years (1860–1864), exploring parts of the interior of the South Island and writing about it in A First Year in Canterbury Settlement (1863).

The novel is one of the first to explore ideas of artificial intelligence, as influenced by Charles Darwin's recently published On the Origin of Species (1859) and the machines developed out of the Industrial Revolution (late 19th to early 20th centuries). Specifically, it concerns itself, in the three-chapter "Book of the Machines", with the potentially dangerous ideas of machine consciousness and self-replicating machines.

In Erewhon, illness is crime, and crime is illness. As a result, citizens are imprisoned for offenses like physical ailments, misfortune, or ugliness while those who commit conventional crimes like fraud or theft are seen more sympathetically as exhibiting symptoms of moral afflictions and prescribed sessions with a "straightener" (essentially a psychologist) for treatment. The lack of compassion for physical sickness is reflected in the role of physicians in Erewhonian society, which is described as something more akin to that of a judge or law enforcement officer than that of a doctor. This system of law and medicine is a satirical inversion of the pattern in western society where crimes are punished and physical illnesses are treated—immorality is a matter of luck beyond one's control while sickness falls into the purview of one's individual autonomy.

== Content ==
The greater part of the book consists of a description of Erewhon.

=== The Book of the Machines ===
Butler developed the three chapters of Erewhon that make up "The Book of the Machines" from a number of articles he had contributed to The Press, which had just begun publication in Christchurch, New Zealand, beginning with "Darwin among the Machines" (1863). Butler was the first to write about the possibility that machines might develop consciousness by natural selection.

In his preface to the second edition Butler wrote: "I regret that reviewers have in some cases been inclined to treat the chapters on Machines as an attempt to reduce Mr. Darwin's theory to an absurdity. Nothing could be further from my intention, and few things would be more distasteful to me than any attempt to laugh at Mr. Darwin."

=== Characters ===
- Higgs: The narrator, who informs the reader of the nature of Erewhonian society.
- Chowbok (Kahabuka): Higgs' guide into the mountains; he is a native, who greatly fears the Erewhonians. He eventually abandons Higgs.
- Yram: The daughter of Higgs' jailer, who takes care of him when he first enters Erewhon. Her name is Mary spelled backwards.
- Senoj Nosnibor: Higgs' host after he is released from prison; he hopes that Higgs will marry his elder daughter. His name is Robinson Jones backwards.
- Zulora: Senoj Nosnibor's elder daughter. Higgs finds her unpleasant, but her father hopes that Higgs will marry her.
- Arowhena: Senoj Nosnibor's younger daughter; she falls in love with Higgs and runs away with him.
- Mahaina: A woman who claims to suffer from alcoholism but is believed to have a weak temperament.
- Ydgrun: The incomprehensible goddess of the Erewhonians. Her name is an anagram of Grundy (from Mrs. Grundy, a character in Thomas Morton's play Speed the Plough).

== Reception ==
In 1873, the reviewer in the Dunedin newspaper the Otago Witness declared that Erewhon was the best English satirical fiction since Gulliver's Travels (1726).

In a 1945 broadcast, George Orwell praised the book and said that when Butler wrote Erewhon, it needed "imagination of a very high order to see that machinery could be dangerous as well as useful". He recommended the novel, though not its sequel, Erewhon Revisited.

== Adaptations ==
In 2014, New Zealand artist Gavin Hipkins released his first feature film, titled Erewhon and based on Butler's book. It premiered at the New Zealand International Film Festival and the Edinburgh Art Festival.

== Influence ==
The French philosopher Gilles Deleuze used ideas from Butler's book at various points in the development of his philosophy of difference. In Difference and Repetition (1968), Deleuze refers to what he calls "Ideas" as "Erewhon". "Ideas are not concepts", he said, they are "a form of eternally positive differential multiplicity, distinguished from the identity of concepts". "Erewhon" refers to the "nomadic distributions" that pertain to simulacra, which "are not universals like the categories, nor are they the hic et nunc or nowhere, the diversity to which categories apply in representation". "Erewhon", in this reading, is "not only a disguised no-where but a rearranged now-here".

In his collaboration with Félix Guattari, Anti-Oedipus (1972), Deleuze draws on Butler's "The Book of the Machines" to "go beyond" the "usual polemic between vitalism and mechanism", as it relates to their concept of "desiring-machines":

For one thing, Butler is not content to say that machines extend the organism, but asserts that they are really limbs and organs lying on the body without organs of a society, which men will appropriate according to their power and their wealth, and whose poverty deprives them as if they were mutilated organisms. For another, he is not content to say that organisms are machines, but asserts that they contain such an abundance of parts that they must be compared to very different parts of distinct machines, each relating to the others, engendered in combination with the others ... He shatters the vitalist argument by calling in question the specific or personal unity of the organism, and the mechanist argument even more decisively, by calling in question the structural unity of the machine.

== In popular culture ==
Erewhon Station is a high-country station in New Zealand's South Island, neighbouring Mesopotamia Station where Samuel Butler lived for several years. Originally named Stronechrubie Station, it was renamed Erewhon Station in 1915 by the then lease-holder, Sidney Pawson, who was a reader of Samuel Butler's books.

Agatha Christie references Erewhon in her novel Death on the Nile (1937), Chapter 21, search of Ferguson's cabin.

A copy of Erewhon figures in Elizabeth Bowen's short story "The Cat Jumps" (1934).

Karl Popper's book The Open Society and Its Enemies (1945), includes an epigraph from Erewhon that reads: "It will be seen ... that the Erewhonians are a meek and long-suffering people easily led by the nose, and quick to offer up common sense at the shrine of logic, when a philosopher arises among them who carries them away ... by convincing them that their existing institutions are not based on the strictest principles of morality."

Alan M. Turing references Erewhon in his posthumously published paper, "Intelligent Machinery, A Heretical Theory" (c. 1951). He writes: "At some stage therefore we should have to expect the machines to take control, in the way that is mentioned in Samuel Butler's Erewhon."

Aldous Huxley alludes to Erewhon in his novels The Doors of Perception (1954) and Island (1962).

In his book A Testament (1957), Frank Lloyd Wright mistakenly attributes the origin of the term Usonia as an alternate name for the United States of America to Samuel Butler in Erewhon.

The "Butlerian Jihad" is the name of the crusade to wipe out "thinking machines" in Frank Herbert's novel Dune (1965).

C. S. Lewis alludes to Erewhon in his essay "The Humanitarian Theory of Punishment".

The movie The Day of the Dolphin (1973) features a boat named the Erewhon.

"Erewhon" is the unofficial name US astronauts give Regan Station, a military space station in David Brin's novel Earth (1990).

In 1994, a group of ex-Yugoslavian writers in Amsterdam, who had established the PEN centre of Yugoslav Writers in Exile, published a single issue of the literary journal Erewhon.

Bruno Latour includes a quote from Erewhon in his 1994 chapter "Where are the Missing Masses?"

In the 1997 film Face/Off, FBI agent Sean Archer enters Erewhon Prison, a high-tech prison with severe punishment for any transgressions.

In the graphic novel Bye Bye, Earth (2000), Belle's sword is called "Erewhon", and the story makes reference to the novel Erewhon.

New Zealand sound art organization The Audio Foundation published in 2012 an anthology edited by Bruce Russell named Erewhon Calling after Butler's novel.

In "Smile", the second episode of the 2017 season of Doctor Who, the Doctor and Bill explore a spaceship named Erehwon. Despite the slightly different spelling, the episode writer Frank Cottrell-Boyce confirmed that this was a reference to Butler's novel.

In the 2019 Ubisoft video game Tom Clancy's Ghost Recon Breakpoint, "Erewhon" is the name for the world's settler hideout and players' online hub.

A copy of Erewhon figures prominently in the video for "A Barely Lit Path", the lead single from Oneohtrix Point Never's 2023 album Again.

Erewhon Market is the name of an upscale U.S. natural foods grocery chain based in Los Angeles. The store's co-founder Aveline Kushi named it after Erewhon because it was the favorite book of her mentor, George Ohsawa.

Erewhon was also the name of an independent speculative fiction publishing company founded in 2018 by Liz Gorinsky. It was acquired by Kensington Publishing in 2022, where it now functions as an imprint.

== See also ==
- Rangitata River – the location of the high-country Mesopotamia Station, where Samuel Butler lived for a time, and the neighbouring Erewhon Station, named for his book.
- Nacirema – another piece of satirical writing with a similar backwards pun
