= The Humanoids =

1948 science fiction novel by Jack Williamson

- First edition dustcover
- Author: Jack Williamson
- Language: English
- Genre: Science fiction Campbellian science fiction
- Publisher: Simon and Schuster (US)
- Publication date: 1949
- Publication place: United States
- Media type: Print (periodical, hardback & paperback)
- Pages: 239
- Preceded by: "With Folded Hands..." (1947)
- Followed by: The Humanoid Touch (1980)

The Humanoids is a 1949 dystopian science fiction novel by American author Jack Williamson (1908–2006). Originally published as a three-part serial called "...And Searching Mind" in Astounding Science-Fiction (March, April, May 1948), it was in fact a sequel to an earlier novelette, "With Folded Hands...", appearing in the same magazine in July of the previous year of 1947. The Humanoids was published as a hardback book in 1949, but only in 1980 was the award-winning "With Folded Hands..." included in a reissue edition of The Humanoids. Also in 1980, Williamson added a final, separate work to the sequence, namely The Humanoid Touch.

The sequence tells the story of robots called humanoids, so perfect and efficient that human beings are left with nothing to do, and life is reduced to meaninglessness.

== Plot ==
=== Background ===
As laid out in the precursor story ("With Folded Hands..."), and reiterated in The Humanoids, the narrative unfolds thousands of years in the future when humankind has spread out and settled on planets throughout much of the galaxy. Civilizations have risen and fallen. A powerful new technology called rhodomagnetics has emerged. (As a triad of elements can be ferromagnetized — iron, cobalt, nickel — so an analogous triad of elements — rhodium, palladium, silver — can be "rhodomagnetized" according to Williamson's imaginary new science.) On a distant planet called Wing IV, the new science has already resulted in weapons that wiped out most of the population. The inventor — known as Sledge in the earlier work, but changed (without explanation) to Mansfield in the novel — was wracked with guilt. He then used rhodomagnetics to build mechanicals known as "humanoids", perfect sleek black androids, all identical and all controlled by a central transmitter on Wing IV. He imbued them with a Prime Directive: "To Serve and Obey, And Guard Men From Harm". The intent was to prevent future wars and maximize human welfare. But the humanoids were too powerful and their Prime Directive robbed human life of all meaning wherever they went. They are rapidly spreading planet to planet throughout the galaxy, and they appear to be irresistible.

=== Summary ===
On an unnamed planet, some 90 years after the events of "With Folded Hands...", a government physicist named Dr Clay Forester heads a defense project ("Project Lookout") which conceals a more secret defense project ("Project Thunderbolt") at the isolated Starmont Observatory. He is tasked with creating and overseeing deployment of a "rhodomagnetic bomb" to stave off an invasion by rival human colonists on a neighboring planetary system known as the Triplanet Powers. At the Observatory, Forester is visited by a mysterious young girl named Jane Carter who seems to know a lot about him, but inexplicably vanishes. Events unfold rapidly as the humanoids arrive on his world and gently but relentlessly enforce their Prime Directive. Presumably, the same has happened to the Triplanet Powers. The aged and feeble world president is easily outmaneuvered as his valued longtime military aide is revealed to be a humanoid in disguise. Forester's research is halted because it is considered too dangerous. Tobacco, alcohol, unsupervised sex and human-controlled cars and aircraft are all disallowed. Everything new or exciting is utterly forbidden if it has even the slightest potential of harming human beings. Their new accommodations are palatial, but when Forester's wife Ruth complains of boredom, the humanoids respond by giving her a mind-erasing drug (euphoride) which leaves her chemically lobotomized but "happy". Horrified, Forester and his junior clerk Frank Ironsmith reluctantly meet with a secret group of rebels at the ruined old Dragonrock Lighthouse.

The rebels — the mysterious waif met earlier among them — are a gang of misfits who have "paraphysical" powers which the humanoids lack. Their abilities include teleportation (Jane), telekinesis (Lucky Ford), clairvoyance (Ash Overstreet) and telepathy (Graystone the Great). They are led by the flamboyant Mark White, a huge man with red beard and flowing red mane. The rebels, including Forester, now flee and operate out of a deep cavern inaccessible to anyone (including the humanoids) incapable of teleportation. Jane is so proficient at it that she can transport to distant parts of the universe. After lengthy preparations, Forester and Jane resolve to teleport the many lightyears to Wing IV, hack into the central humanoid "electronic brain", and change or eliminate the Prime Directive. Along the way, the initially skeptical Forester has come to accept that "paraphysics" is real enough and discovers its scientific basis: there is yet a third triad of elements (platinum, gold, mercury) responsible for "platinomagnetism". It seems the alchemists of old earth were right and Forester has found the veritable prima materia of the universe. But so have the humanoids (with the help of the disloyal Ironsmith) and they have now almost completed the successor to their first control grid on Wing IV: a new electronic brain based, not on rhodomagnetics, but on platinomagnetics, the underlying principle of all psychophysical, or paramechanical, phenomena. This vast array of platinum relays — known as the Ironsmith grid — will be insurmountable.

With his new understanding, Forester discovers that he has the awesome power to transmogrify matter on the molecular or atomic level with his mind. He can conjure up food, atmosphere, buildings, machines, etc, at will. He calls this paranormal ability "telurgy". He learns that Mark White and the other rebels have been captured and brainwashed by the humanoids. He and Jane teleport about in their attempts to destroy the "platinum brain", but after three hair-raising near misses, Forester simultaneously learns that Ruth (her mind now restored) has left him for Ironsmith and, even more importantly, his new platinomagnetic powers cannot be used for "destructive" or "hateful" purposes. (Which is what he has been doing.) Defeated, he meets the aged, but vital, Mansfield, the discoverer/inventor of rhodomagnetics, who explains everything in benign and avuncular manner. Still not convinced, the stubborn Forester is involuntarily subjected to humanoid brainwashing. Awakening (he soon learns that thirty years have passed) he has now been cured of all misguided emotions and no longer sees any reason to resist. He is joined by Mark White, now also a fellow enthusiast, and learns that Jane Carter is off to the Andromeda Galaxy to select new planets for colonization by humanity and their humanoid overlords.

== Themes ==
The Humanoids presents two overarching themes, or "big ideas":

(1) The concept of an existential threat to the whole of human society from a powerful, but uncontrollable, machine intelligence, and...

(2) The concept that "psychic", or "paranormal", human capabilities represent an as yet untapped potential for the next step in human evolution.

The first of these concepts has become a highly relevant and hotly debated issue at the present day. (See Existential risk from artificial general intelligence; the term "artificial intelligence" was not coined until 1955. In the novel, the term "cybernetics" is referenced briefly, itself a word coined only in 1948.) The second of these concepts was a particular pet project of Williamson's editor at Astounding Science Fiction, John W. Campbell, who sought for many years to delineate a new "science of the mind". In 1951, Williamson coined the word "psionics" for another story he wrote for Campbell, indicating an application for engineering (electronics) to harness the "psychic" potential of the human brain. (The relevance of this theme has not fared so well, as the plausible existence of "psionic", or psychic, capabilities has been more or less completely discredited for lack of evidence.)

The robots of the story interpret their Prime Directive too literally and end up turning people into passive sheep. They don't permit any form of risk-taking, or indeed, anything new or exciting. Even solitude is off limits because unaccompanied humans might accidentally hurt themselves. This leads to a stifling of the human spirit, freedom, and creativity. Humans are not allowed to be human. Jack Williamson summed it up by noting, "A perfect machine would prove to be perfectly destructive." and that "The best possible machines, designed with the best of intentions, become the ultimate horror".

The story is a warning that we should be careful not to let technology become so powerful that it controls us, and that we should not blindly accept the idea of a utopian society without thinking about what it might mean for the quality of human life. In an interview Jack Williamson said, "The ending of the novel was [intended] to be a tragic conclusion seen from the viewpoint of the people who had been brainwashed into thinking they were happy. But my ending proved to be ambiguous and unsatisfactory. I got reviews from probably 50 different newspapers, and no two reviewers read the ending in the same way. In my sequel, The Humanoid Touch, I tried to work out an alternative."

== Reception ==
Fantasy Literature said, "It is a finely written, suspenseful, action-packed yarn that is at the same time chock-full of interesting scientific speculations. It has been called Williamson’s “greatest science fiction novel."

A study by the University of Michigan concluded, "Jack Williamson's novel, The Humanoids (1949), is considered to be one of the most important stories about robots and humanity.

Damon Knight said, "Without doubt one of the most important science-fantasy books of its decade".

In 1977, Williamson's good friend Frederik Pohl reported that "a few years ago" the founder of MIT's AI Laboratory, computer scientist Marvin Minsky, asked to meet Williamson: "Jack was surprised, if not pleased, to hear from Minsky's own lips that The Humanoids was Minsky's personal candidate for the best nontechnical description of the way real artificial intelligence was likely to operate that had ever until that time been written." Williamson reported that in 1980 it was "still being taught at MIT to graduate students in the Artificial Intelligence Department as an example of where computer science may lead".

== See also ==
- Artificial intelligence in fiction
- Robots in literature
