= Transhuman Space =

Transhumanist tabletop role-playing game

- Designers: David L. Pulver
- Publishers: Steve Jackson Games
- Publication: 2002; 24 years ago
- Genres: Science fiction
- Systems: GURPS (3rd and 4th edition)
- A Powered by GURPS game

Transhuman Space is a role-playing game written by David Pulver, and published in 2002 by Steve Jackson Games. It is part of the "Powered by GURPS" (Generic Universal Role-Playing System) line. Set in the year 2100, humanity has begun to colonize the Solar System. The pursuit of transhumanism is now in full swing, as more and more people reach fully posthuman states.

In 2002, the Transhuman Space adventure "Orbital Decay" received an Origins Award nomination for Best Role-Playing Game Adventure. Transhuman Space won the 2003 Grog d'Or Award for Best Role-playing Game, Game Line or RPG Setting.

== Setting ==
The game assumes that no cataclysm — natural or human-induced — swept Earth in the 21st century. Instead, constant developments in information technology, genetic engineering, nanotechnology and nuclear physics generally improved condition of the average human life. Plagues of the 20th century (like cancer or AIDS) have been suppressed, the ozone layer is being restored and Earth's ecosystems are recovering (although thermal emission by fusion power plants poses an environmental threat—albeit a much lesser one than previous sources of energy). Thanks to modern medicine humans live biblical timespans surrounded by various artificially intelligent helper applications and robots (cybershells), sensory experience broadcasts (future TV) and cyberspace telepresence. Thanks to cheap and clean fusion energy humanity has power to fuel all these wonders, restore and transform its home planet and finally settle on other heavenly bodies.

Human genetic engineering has advanced to the point that anyone—single individuals, same-sex couples, groups of three or more—can reproduce. The embryos can be allowed to be developed naturally, or they can undergo three levels of tinkering: 1. Genefixing, which corrects defects; 2. Upgrades, which boost natural abilities (Ishtar Upgrades are slightly more attractive than usual, Metanoia Upgrades are more intelligent, etc.); and... 3. Full transition to parahuman status (Nyx Parahumans only need a few hours of sleep per week, Aquamorphs can live underwater, etc.) Another type of human genetic engineering, far more controversial, is the creation of bioroids, fully sentient slave races.

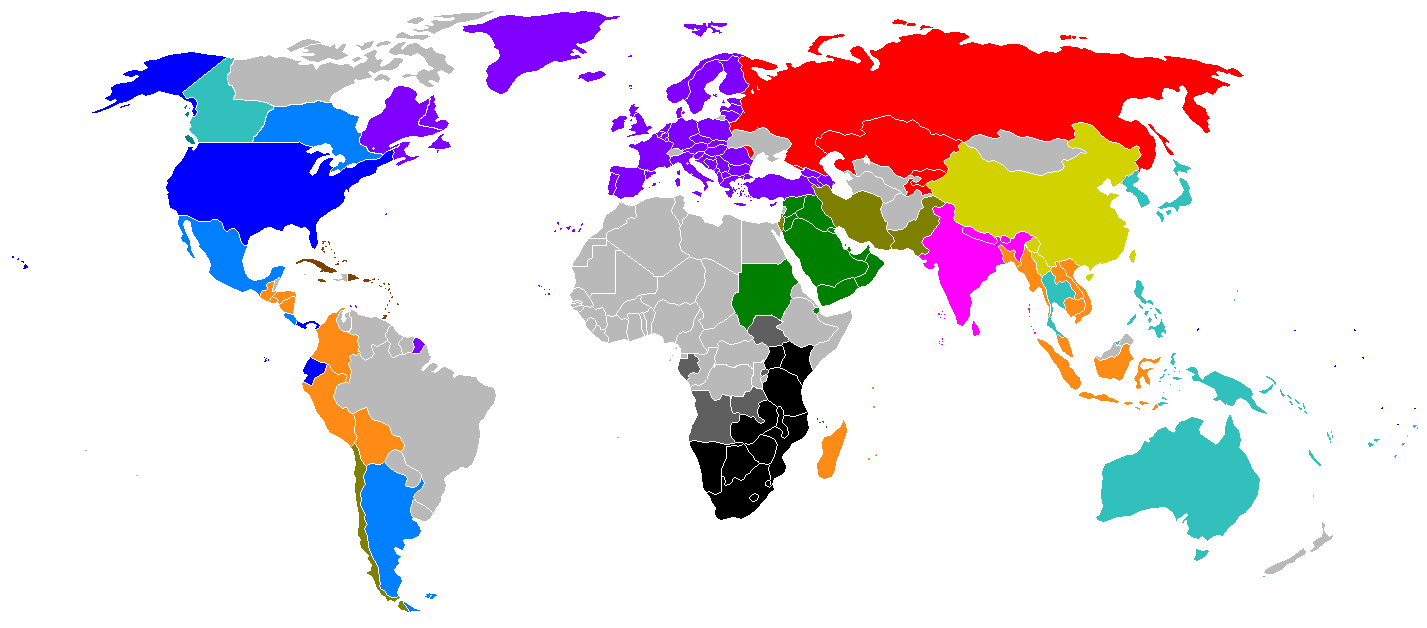
Political map of Earth in the Transhuman Space setting. Chinese Bloc Other allies of China American Bloc Other allies of the USA European Union Pacific Rim Alliance Indian Bloc Caribbean Union South African Coalition Other allies of the SAC Transpacific Socialist Alliance Russian Bloc Islamic Caliphate Unaffiliated

People can "upload" by recording the simulation of their brains on computer disks. The emulated individual then becomes a ghost, an infomorph very easily confused with "sapient artificial intelligence". However, this technology has several problems as the solely available "brainpeeling" technique is fatal to the original biological lifeform being simulated, has a significant failure rate and the philosophical questions regarding personal identity remain equivocal. Any infomorph, regardless of its origin, can be plugged into a "cybershell" (robotic or cybernetic body), or a biological body, or "bioshell". Or, the individual can illegally make multiple "xoxes", or copies of themselves, and scatter them throughout the system, exponentially increasing the odds that at least one of them will live for centuries more, if not forever.

This is also a time of space colonization. First, humanity (specifically China, followed by the United States and others) colonized Mars in a fashion resembling that outlined in the Mars Direct project. The Moon, Lagrangian points, inner planets and asteroids soon followed. In the late 21st century even some of Saturn's moons have been settled as a base for that planet's Helium-3 scooping operations.

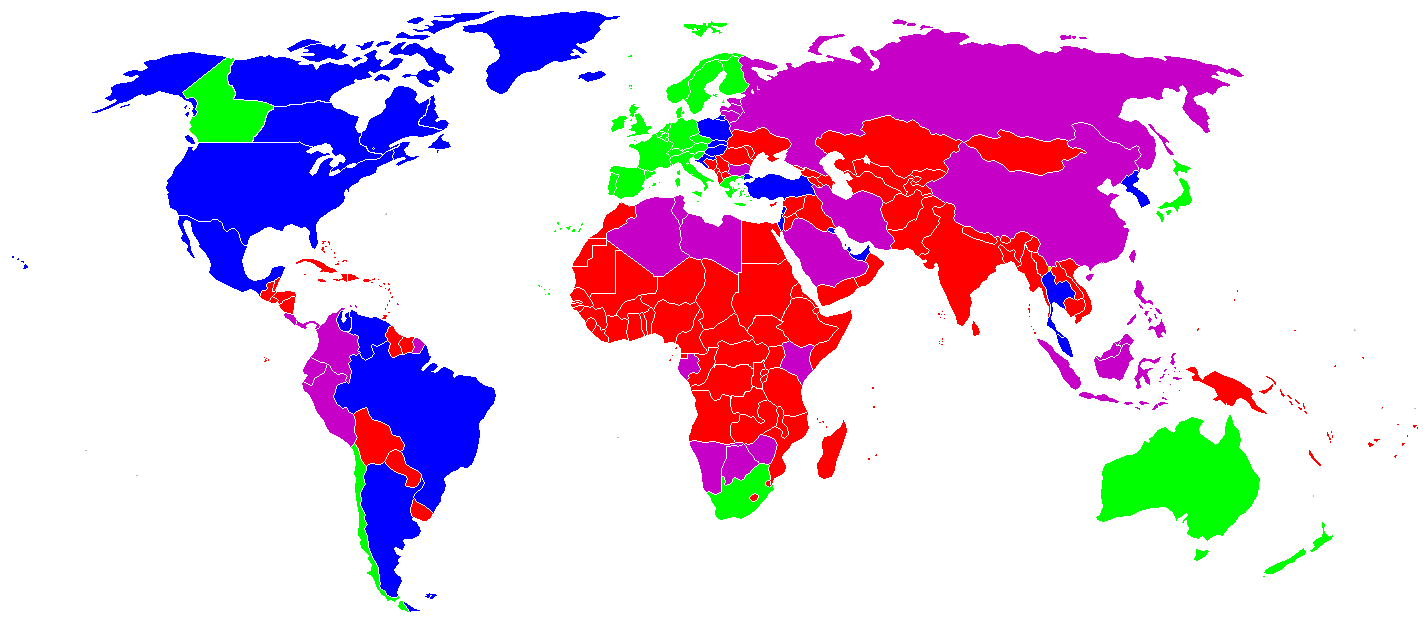
Economic map of Earth in the Transhuman Space setting. Fifth Wave: (Memetics, Nanoengineering, and AI) Fourth Wave: (Biotech) Third Wave: (Information Age) Below Average

Transhuman Space's setting is neither utopia nor dystopia, however: several problems have arisen from these otherwise beneficial developments. The generation gap has become a chasm as lifespans increase. No longer do the elite fear death, and no longer can the young hope to replace them. While it seemed that outworld colonies would offer accommodation and work for those young ones, they are being replaced by genetically tailored bioroids and AI-powered cybershells. The concept of humanity is no longer clear in a world where even some animals speak of their rights and the dead haunt both cyberspace and reality (in form of infomorph-controlled bioshells or cybershells).

The benefits of advanced science and technology are far from equally distributed. While some countries are still struggling with informatization, others are dealing with nanoplagues, faulty medications, and implants and software tested on their own populations. In some impoverished nations, technologically advanced tyrants use their power to oppress already disadvantaged populations. Meanwhile, beyond Earth, various forms of modern crime continue to flourish, kept largely in check by military forces.

== Publication history ==
After Steve Jackson Games (SJG) had published the GURPS Lite line, they followed it with "Powered by GURPS" line, without using the name "GURPS" in the book title. Transhuman Space by David Pulver was one of the first "Powered by GURPS" publications. Transhuman Space received a significant amount of supporting publications, and was the largest original background setting that SJG has produced in 15 years. Shannon Appelcline noted that by its inclusion of posthuman characters, the book began to show the limits of the GURPS system as it was, which is something that Pulver would address soon thereafter.

SJG has not updated Transhuman Space to the GURPS fourth edition rules, although the supplement Transhuman Space: Changing Times provides a path for migrating to them. SJG has produced several fourth edition supplements for the setting: Transhuman Space: Bioroid Bazaar, Transhuman Space: Cities on the Edge, Transhuman Space: Martial Arts 2100, Transhuman Space: Personnel Files 2-5, Transhuman Space: Shell-Tech, GURPS Spaceships 8: Transhuman Spacecraft, Transhuman Space: Transhuman Mysteries, and Transhuman Space: Wings of the Rising Sun.

== Reception ==
In a review of Transhuman Space in Black Gate, William Stoddard said "Transhuman Space was a richly detailed setting; if it had imperfections, it had enough depth to make up for them. I think it has the potential to become a classic in its field. Perhaps a campaign set in its default start year of 2100 could leave the early twenty-first century blurry enough to avoid obvious incongruities."

== Reviews ==
- Review in Vol. 20, No. 1 of Prometheus, the journal of the Libertarian Futurist Society.

== See also ==
- Eclipse Phase – Tabletop science fiction role-playing game
- Orion's Arm – Science fiction world-building project
- Hard science fiction
- List of GURPS books
- GURPS Basic Set
- Pyramid, a monthly online magazine with GURPS support
