= Mesopotamia Station =

High country station in the South Island of New Zealand

Coordinates: 43°38′26″S 170°53′48″E

Mesopotamia Station is a high-country station in New Zealand's South Island. Known mainly for one of its first owners, the novelist Samuel Butler, it is probably the country's best known station. Despite popular belief, Butler was not the station's first owner.

== Geography ==
Mesopotamia originally occupied the country between the Rangitata River and the top of the Two Thumb Range, from Forest Creek upwards, and for many years included the Cloudy Peak forks of the Rangitata, which later became part of Stronechrubie Station.

== Ownership ==
Map

While many attribute the formation of the station to Butler, most parts of the station had been allotted several years before to various individuals.

Butler arrived in Lyttelton on 27 January 1860 on the Roman Emperor. He left England to get away from his father, and to free himself from constraints imposed by religion and law. He explored the headwaters of several Canterbury rivers, helped by his background in cross-country running, a sport pioneered at his former school, Shrewsbury. After taking several trips into the Canterbury High Country finally settled on and successfully applied for Run No. 367 in this area. He spent the following winter on the run with his stock, constructing his hut several miles up Forest Creek. The location of where the hut was situated is marked by a plaque today. Butler expanded his holdings over the following years by acquiring neighboring runs and establishing the station. Butler ran the station for approximately four years before selling and returning to England with double his initial investment (£8,000).

Mesopotamia Station was placed under tenure review in 2003, with 20,863 hectares out of the present 26,115 hectares becoming public conservation land. The remaining land (5,252 hectares) was freeholded to the leaseholder. The current holders of the pastoral lease is the Prouting family who have held it since 1945.
