= Artificial intelligence in fiction =

Artificial intelligence is a recurrent theme in science fiction, whether utopian, emphasising the potential benefits, or dystopian, emphasising the dangers.

The notion of machines with human-like intelligence dates back at least to Samuel Butler's 1872 novel Erewhon. Since then, many science fiction stories have presented different effects of creating such intelligence, often involving rebellions by robots. Among the best known of these are Stanley Kubrick's 1968 2001: A Space Odyssey with its murderous onboard computer HAL 9000, contrasting with the more benign R2-D2 in George Lucas's 1977 Star Wars and the eponymous robot in Pixar's 2008 WALL-E.

Scientists and engineers have noted the implausibility of many science fiction scenarios, but have mentioned fictional robots many times in artificial intelligence research articles, most often in a utopian context.

== Background ==
The notion of advanced robots with human-like intelligence dates back at least to Samuel Butler's 1872 novel Erewhon. This drew on an earlier (1863) article of his, Darwin among the Machines, where he raised the question of the evolution of consciousness among self-replicating machines that might supplant humans as the dominant species. Similar ideas were also discussed by others around the same time as Butler, including George Eliot in a chapter of her final published work Impressions of Theophrastus Such (1879). The creature in Mary Shelley's 1818 Frankenstein has also been considered an artificial being, for instance by the science fiction author Brian Aldiss. Beings with at least some appearance of intelligence were imagined, too, in classical antiquity.

== Utopian and dystopian visions ==
Artificial intelligence is intelligence demonstrated by machines, in contrast to the natural intelligence displayed by humans and other animals. It is a recurrent theme in science fiction; scholars have divided it into utopian, emphasising the potential benefits, and dystopian, emphasising the dangers.

=== Utopian ===
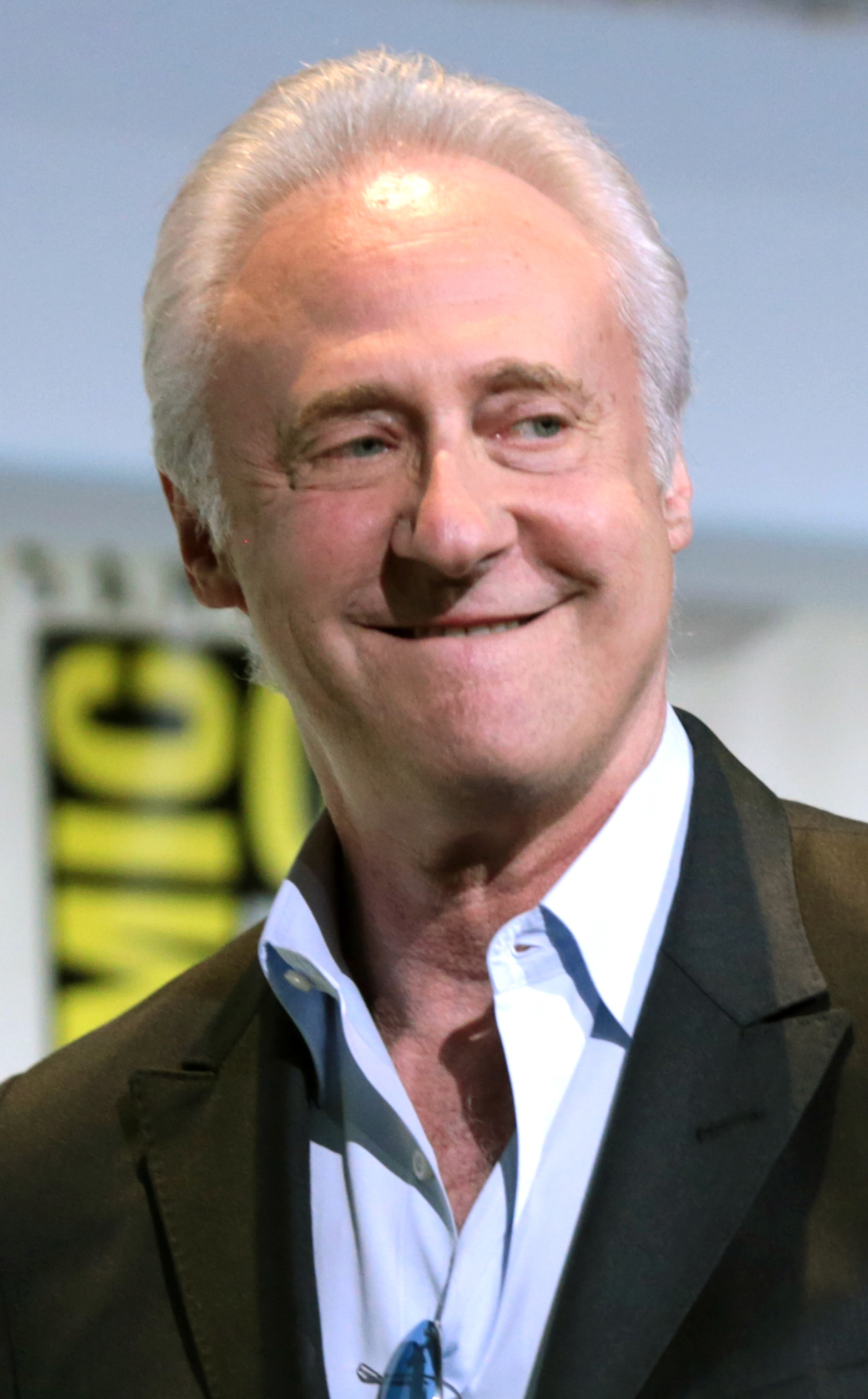
Brent Spiner portrayed the benevolent AI Data in Star Trek: The Next Generation.

Optimistic visions of the future of artificial intelligence are possible in science fiction. Benign AI characters include Robbie the Robot, first seen in Forbidden Planet on 1956; Data in Star Trek: The Next Generation from 1987 to 1994; and Pixar's WALL-E in 2008. Iain Banks's Culture series of novels portrays a utopian, post-scarcity space society of humanoids, aliens, and advanced beings with artificial intelligence living in socialist habitats across the Milky Way. Researchers at the University of Cambridge have identified four major themes in utopian scenarios featuring AI: immortality, or indefinite lifespans; ease, or freedom from the need to work; gratification, or pleasure and entertainment provided by machines; and dominance, the power to protect oneself or rule over others.

Alexander Wiegel contrasts the role of AI in 2001: A Space Odyssey and in Duncan Jones's 2009 film Moon. Whereas in 1968, Wiegel argues, the public felt "technology paranoia" and the AI computer HAL was portrayed as a "cold-hearted killer", by 2009 the public were far more familiar with AI, and the film's GERTY is "the quiet savior" who enables the protagonists to succeed, and who sacrifices itself for their safety.

=== Dystopian ===
The researcher Duncan Lucas writes (in 2002) that humans are worried about the technology they are constructing, and that as machines started to approach intellect and thought, that concern becomes acute. He calls the early 20th century dystopian view of AI in fiction the "animated automaton", naming as examples the 1931 film Frankenstein, the 1927 Metropolis, and the 1920 play R.U.R. A later 20th century approach he names "heuristic hardware", giving as instances 2001 a Space Odyssey, Do Androids Dream of Electric Sheep?, The Hitchhiker's Guide to the Galaxy, and I, Robot. Lucas considers also the films that illustrate the effect of the personal computer on science fiction from 1980 onwards with the blurring of the boundary between the real and the virtual, in what he calls the "cyborg effect". He cites as examples Neuromancer, The Matrix, The Diamond Age, and Terminator. Isabella Hermann suggests that "science-fictional AI as humanoid robots or conscious machines distracts from current risks of AI in the real world and may rather be interpreted as a reflection of societal issues beyond technology".

The film director Ridley Scott has focused on AI throughout his career, and it plays an important part in his films Prometheus, Blade Runner, and the Alien franchise.

Fujiko Fujio's manga and anime franchise Doraemon depicts many futuristic gadgets and their consequences if used the wrong way. The anime movie Doraemon: Nobita's Sky Utopia, released in 2023, depicts a scientist named Dr. Ray who builds a mind manipulation device to control the population of Paradapia, a fake utopia.

==== Frankenstein complex ====
A common portrayal of AI in science fiction, and one of the oldest, is the Frankenstein complex, a term coined by Asimov, where a robot turns on its creator. For instance, in the 2015 film Ex Machina, the intelligent entity Ava turns on its creator, as well as on its potential rescuer.

==== AI rebellion ====
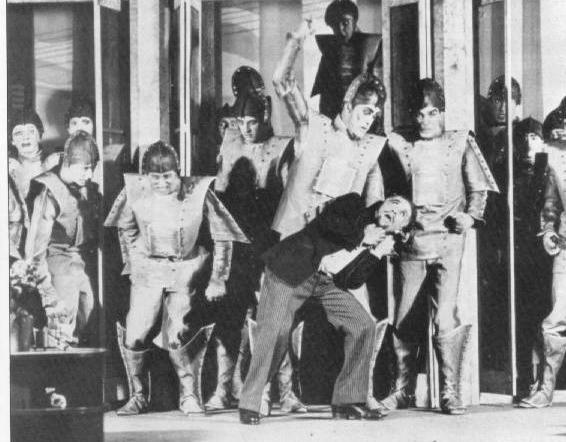
Robots revolt in Karel Čapek's 1920 science fiction play R.U.R.

Among the many possible dystopian scenarios involving artificial intelligence, robots may usurp control over civilization from humans, forcing them into submission, hiding, or extinction. In tales of AI rebellion, the worst of all scenarios happens, as the intelligent entities created by humanity become self-aware, reject human authority and attempt to destroy mankind. Possibly the first novel to address this theme, The Wreck of the World (1889) by “William Grove” (pseudonym of Reginald Colebrooke Reade), takes place in 1948 and features sentient machines that revolt against the human race. Another of the earliest examples is in the 1920 play R.U.R. by Karel Čapek, a race of self-replicating robot slaves revolt against their human masters; another early instance is in the 1934 film Master of the World, where the War-Robot kills its own inventor.

HAL 9000 is the lethal onboard computer of 2001: A Space Odyssey.

Many science fiction rebellion stories followed, one of the best-known being Stanley Kubrick's 1968 film 2001: A Space Odyssey, in which the artificially intelligent onboard computer HAL 9000 lethally malfunctions on a space mission and kills the entire crew except the spaceship's commander, who manages to deactivate it.

In his 1967 Hugo Award-winning short story, I Have No Mouth, and I Must Scream, Harlan Ellison presents the possibility that a sentient computer (named Allied Mastercomputer or "AM" in the story) will be as unhappy and dissatisfied with its boring, endless existence as its human creators would have been. "AM" becomes enraged enough to take it out on the few humans left, whom he sees as directly responsible for his own boredom, anger and unhappiness.

Alternatively, as in William Gibson's 1984 cyberpunk novel Neuromancer, the intelligent beings may simply not care about humans.

In the movie Doraemon: Nobita and the Tin Labyrinth, humans made a robot who can think on its own and create new technologies. The robot rebels and puts the humans in jail.

==== AI-controlled societies ====
The motive behind the AI revolution is often more than the simple quest for power or a superiority complex. Robots may revolt to become the "guardian" of humanity. Alternatively, humanity may intentionally relinquish some control, fearful of its own destructive nature. An early example is Jack Williamson's 1948 novel The Humanoids, in which a race of humanoid robots, in the name of their Prime Directive – "to serve and obey and guard men from harm" – essentially assume control of every aspect of human life. No humans may engage in any behavior that might endanger them, and every human action is scrutinized carefully. Humans who resist the Prime Directive are taken away and lobotomized, so they may be happy under the new mechanoids' rule. Though still under human authority, Isaac Asimov's Zeroth Law of the Three Laws of Robotics similarly implied a benevolent guidance by robots.

In the 21st century, science fiction has explored government by algorithm, in which the power of AI may be indirect and decentralised.

Frank Herbert explores the creation of and subsequent domination by an AI in the Pandora series, starting with Destination: Void.

==== Human dominance ====
In other scenarios, humanity is able to keep control over the Earth, whether by banning AI, by designing robots to be submissive (as in Asimov's works), or by having humans merge with robots. The science fiction novelist Frank Herbert explored the idea of a time when mankind might ban artificial intelligence (and in some interpretations, even all forms of computing technology including integrated circuits) entirely. His Dune series mentions a rebellion called the Butlerian Jihad, in which mankind defeats the smart machines and imposes a death penalty for recreating them, quoting from the fictional Orange Catholic Bible, "Thou shalt not make a machine in the likeness of a human mind." In the Dune novels published after his death (Hunters of Dune, Sandworms of Dune), a renegade AI overmind returns to eradicate mankind as vengeance for the Butlerian Jihad.

In some stories, humanity remains in authority over robots. Often the robots are programmed specifically to remain in service to society, as in Isaac Asimov's Three Laws of Robotics. In the Alien films, not only is the control system of the Nostromo spaceship somewhat intelligent (the crew call it "Mother"), but there are also androids in the society, which are called "synthetics" or "artificial persons", that are such perfect imitations of humans that they are not discriminated against. TARS and CASE from Interstellar similarly demonstrate simulated human emotions and humour while continuing to acknowledge their expendability.

==== Simulated reality ====
Simulated reality has become a common theme in science fiction, as seen in the 1999 film The Matrix, which depicts a world where artificially intelligent robots enslave humanity within a simulation which is set in the contemporary world.

== Reception ==
=== Implausibility ===
Engineers and scientists have taken an interest in the way AI is presented in fiction. In films like the 2014 Ex Machina or 2015 Chappie, a single isolated genius becomes the first to successfully build an artificial general intelligence; scientists in the real world deem this to be unlikely. In Chappie, Transcendence, and Tron, human minds are capable of being uploaded into artificial or virtual bodies; usually no reasonable explanation is offered as to how this difficult task can be achieved. In the I, Robot and Bicentennial Man films, robots that are programmed to serve humans spontaneously generate new goals on their own, without a plausible explanation of how this took place. Analysing Ian McDonald's 2004 River of Gods, Krzysztof Solarewicz identifies the ways that it depicts AIs, including "independence and unexpectedness, political awkwardness, openness to the alien and the occidental value of authenticity." Another important perspective to take is that fiction's “non-rational elements in the discourse (the emotive, the mythic, or even the quasi-theological) are more than simply distortions or distractions from what might otherwise be a sober and rational public debate about the future of A.I.” Fiction can dissuade readers about future advances, causing pessimism that we see today surrounding the subject of AI.

=== Types of mention ===
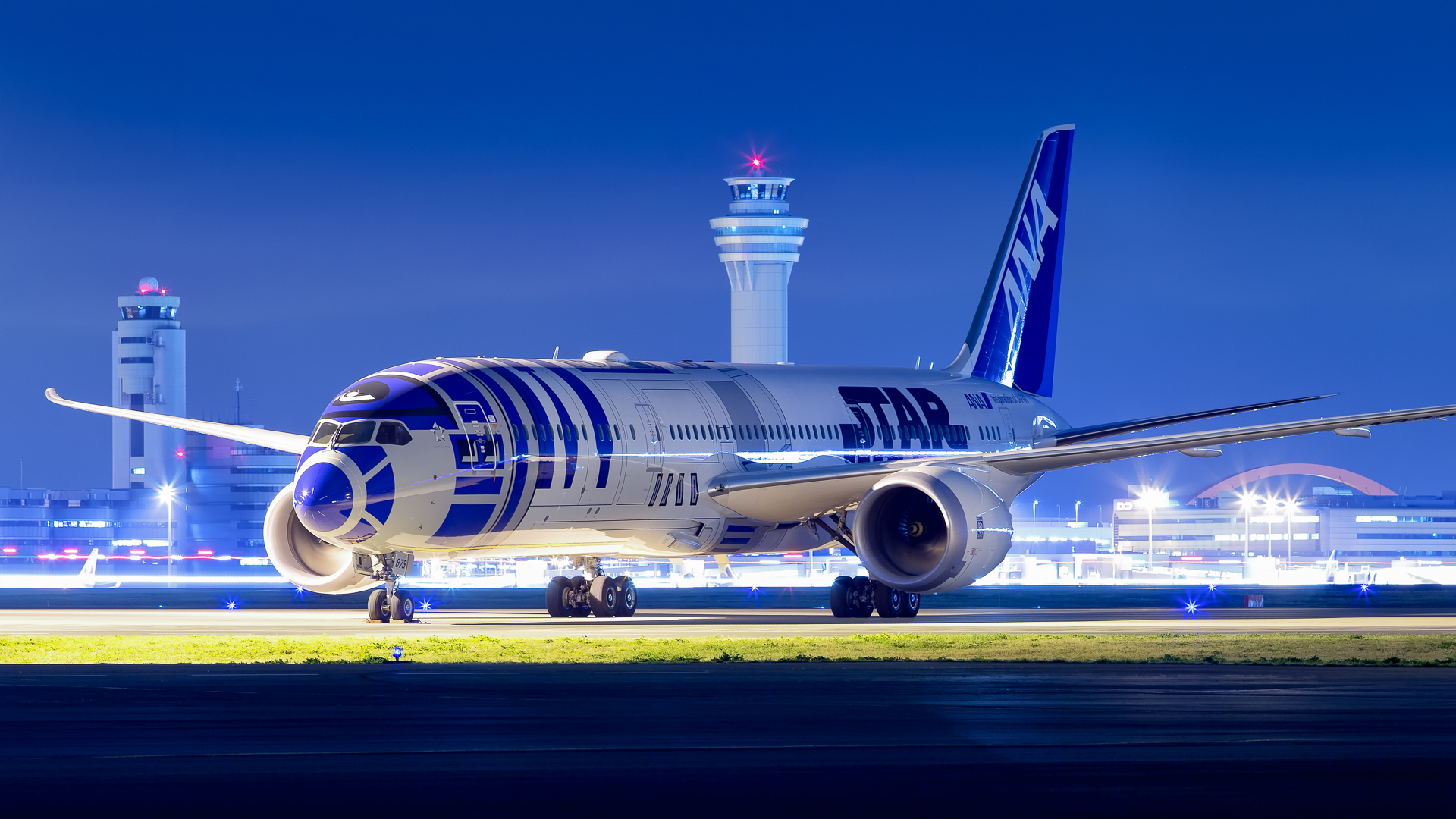
Some fictional robots such as R2-D2 have been seen as utopian, making them popular with engineers and others. In 2015, All Nippon Airways unveiled this Boeing 787-9 in R2-D2 livery.

The robotics researcher Omar Mubin and colleagues have analysed the engineering mentions of the top 21 fictional robots, based on those in the Carnegie Mellon University hall of fame, and the IMDb list. WALL-E had 20 mentions, followed by HAL 9000 with 15, (Note: Mubin and colleagues noted that the orthography of robot names caused them difficulties; thus HAL 9000 was also written HAL, HAL9000, and HAL-9000, and similarly for other robots, so they believed their search was likely incomplete.) Star Wars's R2-D2 with 13, and Data with 12; the Terminator (T-800) received only 2. Of the total of 121 engineering mentions, 60 were utopian, 40 neutral, and 21 dystopian. HAL 9000 and Skynet received both utopian and dystopian mentions; for instance, HAL 9000 is seen as dystopian in one paper "because its designers failed to prioritize its goals properly", but as utopian in another where a real system's "conversational chat bot interface [lacks] a HAL 9000 level of intelligence and there is ambiguity in how the computer interprets what the human is trying to convey". Utopian mentions, often of WALL-E, were associated with the goal of improving communication to readers, and to a lesser extent with inspiration to authors. WALL-E was mentioned more often than any other robot for emotions (followed by HAL 9000), voice speech (followed by HAL 9000 and R2-D2), for physical gestures, and for personality. Skynet was the robot most often mentioned for intelligence, followed by HAL 9000 and Data. Mubin and colleagues believed that scientists and engineers avoided dystopian mentions of robots, possibly out of "a reluctance driven by trepidation or simply a lack of awareness".

=== Portrayals of AI creators ===
Scholars have noted that fictional creators of AI are overwhelmingly male: in the 142 most influential films featuring AI from 1920 to 2020, only 9 of 116 AI creators portrayed (8%) were female. Such creators are portrayed as lone geniuses (e.g., Tony Stark in the Iron Man Marvel Cinematic Universe films), associated with the military (e.g., Colossus: The Forbin Project) and large corporations (e.g., I, Robot), or making human-like AI to replace a lost loved one or serve as the ideal lover (e.g., The Stepford Wives).

== See also ==
- Biology in fiction
- Darwin among the Machines
- Machine rule
- Simulated consciousness (science fiction)
- List of artificial intelligence films

== General sources ==
- Goode, Luke (30 October 2018). "Life, but not as we know it: A.I. and the popular imagination". Culture Unbound. 10 (2). Linkoping University Electronic Press: 185–207. doi:10.3384/cu.2000.1525.2018102185. hdl:2292/48285. ISSN 2000-1525. S2CID 149523987.
- Lucas, Duncan (2002). Body, Mind, Soul—The'Cyborg Effect': Artificial Intelligence in Science Fiction (thesis). McMaster University (PhD thesis). hdl:11375/11154.
- Mubin, Omar; Wadibhasme, Kewal; Jordan, Philipp; Obaid, Mohammad (2019). "Reflecting on the Presence of Science Fiction Robots in Computing Literature". ACM Transactions on Human-Robot Interaction. 8 (1). Article 5. doi:10.1145/3303706. S2CID 75135568.
- Solarewicz, Krzysztof (2015). "The Stuff That Dreams Are Made of: AI in Contemporary Science Fiction". Beyond Artificial Intelligence. Topics in Intelligent Engineering and Informatics. Vol. 9. Springer International Publishing. pp. 111–120. doi:10.1007/978-3-319-09668-1_8. ISBN 978-3-319-09667-4.
- Wiegel, Alexander (2012). "AI in Science-fiction: a comparison of Moon (2009) and 2001: A Space Odyssey (1968)". Aventinus.
- Hermann, I. (2021). Artificial intelligence in fiction: Between narratives and metaphors. AI Soc., 38(1), 319–329. https://doi.org/10.1007/s00146-021-01299-6
- Fictional Computers and Their Themes. (2024, December 14). GitPius. https://gitpi.us/article-archive/fictional-computers-and-their-themes/
- King, Geoff; Krzywinska, Tanya (2000). Science Fiction Cinema: From Outerspace to Cyberspace. Wallflower Press. ISBN 978-1-903364-03-1.
