= Erewhon Revisited =

1901 novel by Samuel Butler

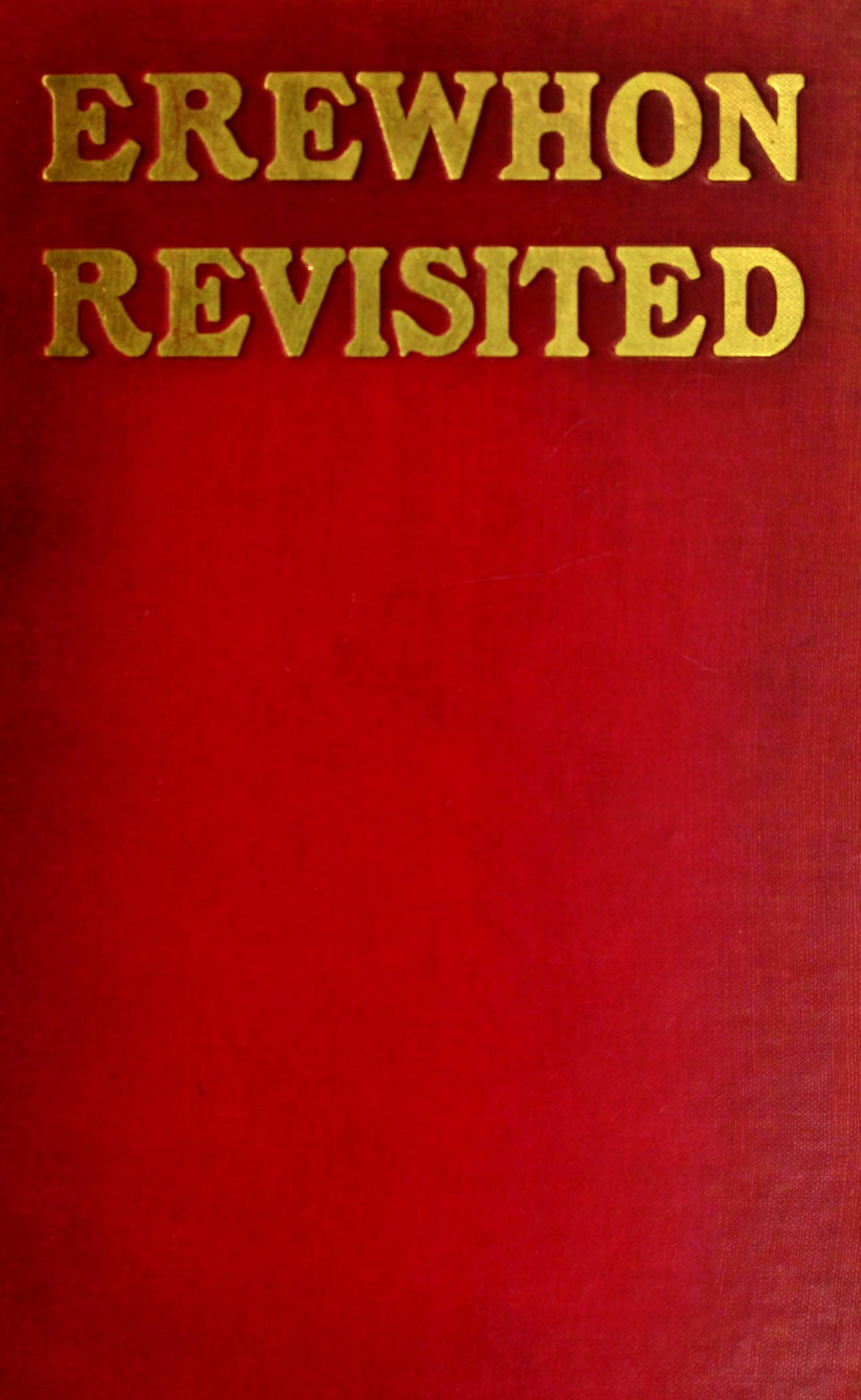
- First edition cover
- Author: Samuel Butler
- Language: English
- Genre: Satire, Science fiction
- Publisher: Grant Richards
- Publication date: 1901
- Publication place: United Kingdom
- Preceded by: Erewhon
- Text: Erewhon Revisited online

Erewhon Revisited Twenty Years Later, Both by the Original Discoverer of the Country and by His Son (1901) is a satirical novel by Samuel Butler, forming a belated sequel to his Erewhon (1872). The Cambridge History of English and American Literature judges that it "has less of the free imaginative play of its predecessor…but, in sharp brilliance of wit and criticism, in intellectual unity and coherence, it surpasses Erewhon".

Erewhon, set in a thinly disguised New Zealand, ended with the escape of its unnamed protagonist from the native Erewhonians by balloon. In the sequel, narrated by his son John, the reader is told that the hero's name is Higgs. Higgs returns to Erewhon and meets his former lover Yram, who is now the mother of his son George. He discovers that he is now worshipped as "the Sunchild", his escape having been interpreted as an ascension into heaven, and that a church of Sunchildism has sprung up. He finds himself in danger from the villainous Professors Hanky and Panky, who are determined to protect Sunchildism from him. With George's help Higgs escapes from their clutches and returns to England.

The Swiftian device of setting his satire in a fictional culture enabled Butler, as the critic Elinor Shaffer has written, "to analyse the phenomena of religion from their point of genesis, while disclaiming all responsibility for their uncanny parallels to certain known religions." It did not however make the road to publication any easier. When Butler submitted the manuscript to the respectable and long-established house of Longman, who had in recent years become his regular publishers, they rejected it for fear of offending their High Church clientele, even when Butler offered to pay the costs himself. On March 24, 1901, he wrote to George Bernard Shaw, conceding that the book was "far more wicked than Erewhon", and asking for his advice. Shaw replied recommending his own publisher, Grant Richards, and lost no time introducing Butler to him. The book duly came out under the Grant Richards imprint.
