= Darwin among the Machines =

1863 newspaper article by Samuel Butler

"Darwin among the Machines" is a letter to the editor written by Samuel Butler but signed Cellarius, published in The Press newspaper in Christchurch, New Zealand, on 13 June 1863. The title references the work of Charles Darwin. The letter raised the possibility that machines were a kind of "mechanical life" undergoing constant evolution, and that eventually machines might supplant humans as the dominant species.

== Book of the Machines ==
Butler developed this and subsequent articles into The Book of the Machines, three chapters of Erewhon, published anonymously in 1872. The Erewhonian society Butler envisioned had long ago undergone a revolution that destroyed most mechanical inventions. The narrator of the story finds a book that details the reasons for this revolution, which he translates for the reader.

Despite the initial popularity of Erewhon, Butler commented in the preface to the second edition that reviewers had "in some cases been inclined to treat the chapters on Machines as an attempt to reduce Mr. Darwin's theory to an absurdity". He protested that "few things would be more distasteful to me than any attempt to laugh at Mr. Darwin", but also added: "I am surprised, however, that the book at which such an example of the specious misuse of analogy would seem most naturally levelled should have occurred to no reviewer; neither shall I mention the name of the book here, though I should fancy that the hint given will suffice", which may suggest that the chapter on Machines was in fact a satire intended to illustrate the "specious misuse of analogy", even if the target was not Darwin. Butler, fearing that he had offended Darwin, wrote him a letter explaining that the actual target was Joseph Butler's 1736 The Analogy of Religion, Natural and Revealed, to the Constitution and Course of Nature. The Victorian scholar Herbert Sussman has suggested that although Butler's exploration of machine evolution was intended to be whimsical, he may also have been genuinely interested in the notion that living organisms are a type of mechanism and was exploring this notion with his writings on machines, while the philosopher Louis Flaccus called it "a mixture of fun, satire, and thoughtful speculation".

== Evolution of Global Intelligence ==
George Dyson applies Butler's original premise to the artificial life and intelligence of Alan Turing in Darwin Among the Machines: The Evolution of Global Intelligence (1998) ISBN 0-7382-0030-1, to suggest that the internet is a living, sentient being:

Dyson's main claim is that the evolution of a conscious mind from today's technology is inevitable. It is not clear whether this will be a single mind or multiple minds, how smart that mind would be, and even if we will be able to communicate with it. He also clearly suggests that there are forms of intelligence on Earth that we are currently unable to understand. From the book: "What mind, if any, will become apprehensive of the great coiling of ideas now under way is not a meaningless question, but it is still too early in the game to expect an answer that is meaningful to us."

== See also ==
- All Watched Over by Machines of Loving Grace (TV series)
- Artificial intelligence
- Butlerian Jihad, a fictional historical event originally introduced in Frank Herbert's Dune novels, whose name has often been interpreted as a reference to Butler
- Gray goo
- Man–Computer Symbiosis (1960 paper by J. C. R. Licklider)
- Neo-Luddism
- Technological singularity
- Technophobia
- Existential risk from artificial intelligence

== Bibliography ==
- Correspondence to The Press: Darwin Among the Machines – Saturday, June 13, 1863 (photocopy of the original newspaper article)
- Darwin Among the Machines (published posthumously in The Notebooks of Samuel Butler in 1917, with slight variations from the original article in The Press)
- "Darwin Among the Machines [To the Editor of the Press, Christchurch, New Zealand, 13 June, 1863.] (transcription of the version as published in 'The Notebooks of Samuel Butler', 1917)". New Zealand Electronic Text Centre. Archived from the original on 24 May 2006.
- Project Gutenberg eBook Erewhon by Samuel Butler.
