= Roman Emperor (ship) =

History
- Name: Roman Emperor
- Launched: 1848

General characteristics
- Sail plan: Full-rigged ship

Roman Emperor was a full-rigged ship built in 1848.

The Roman Emperor made at least two voyages from England to New Zealand, arriving there in 1860 and 1863. Each voyage carried many immigrants to New Zealand.

The English novelist Samuel Butler arrived in Christchurch (at the port of Lyttelton) on the Roman Emperor in January 1860.
