= Infomorph =

Virtual body of information that possesses self-awareness and sentience

An infomorph is a virtual body of information that possesses self-awareness and sentience. The term was coined in Charles Platt's 1991 novel The Silicon Man, where it refers to a single biological consciousness transferred into a computer through a process of mind transfer. In the book, a character defines an infomorph as "intelligence held in a computer memory", and an "information entity".

In the 2002 game Transhuman Space, an infomorph is any form of sentient or near-sentient computer program, which may exist either only in the computer networks or occupy a physical body: robot, android, a living thing ("wetware", "bioshell"). They may be of two main types: mind emulations (mind-uploaded human intelligencies) and "native" artificial intelligencies. These types are further classified into subtypes.

In EVE Online, players are posthuman entities known as capsuleers: immortal spacecraft commanders who can cheat death by scanning and transferring their consciousness into remote clones. "Infomorph Psychology" and "Advanced Infomorph Psychology" are neural enhancement skills for pilots using "jump clones" to alleviate the unsettling effect of the detaching of one's consciousness and transferring it into a remote clone.

== See also ==
- Ascension (Stargate)
- Mind uploading
- Omega Point
- Simulated reality
