= Samuel Butler (novelist) =

English novelist and critic (1835–1902)

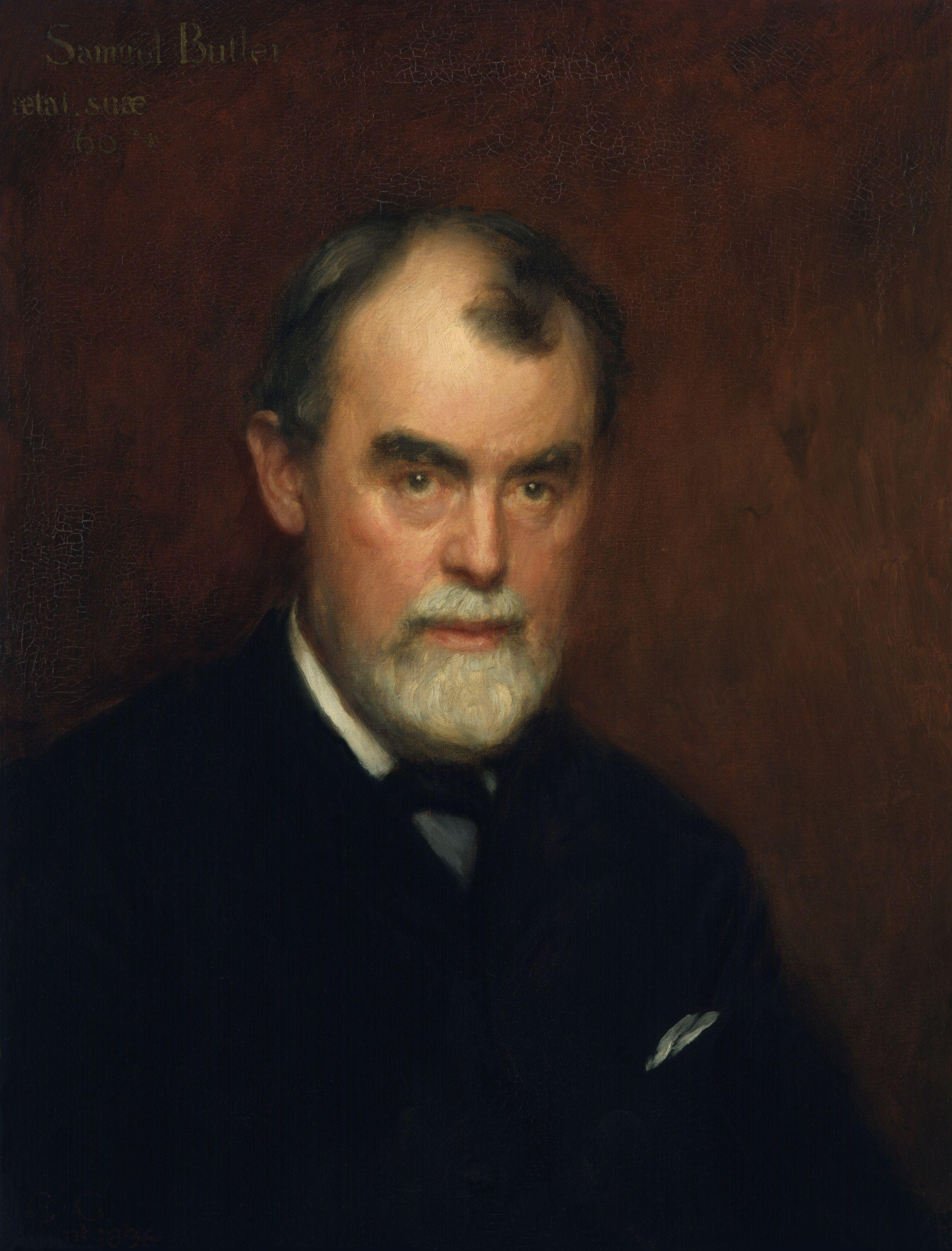
- Portrait by Charles Gogin
- Born: 4 December 1835; Langar, Nottinghamshire, England
- Died: 18 June 1902 (aged 66); London, England
- Education: Shrewsbury School; St John's College, Cambridge
- Occupations: Novelist, critic

Samuel Butler (4 December 1835 – 18 June 1902) was an English novelist and critic, best known for the satirical utopian novel Erewhon (1872) and the semi-autobiographical novel The Way of All Flesh (published posthumously in 1903 with substantial revisions and published in its original form in 1964 as Ernest Pontifex or The Way of All Flesh). Both novels have remained in print since their initial publication. In other studies he examined Christian orthodoxy, evolutionary thought, and Italian art, and made prose translations of the Iliad and Odyssey that are still consulted.

== Early life ==
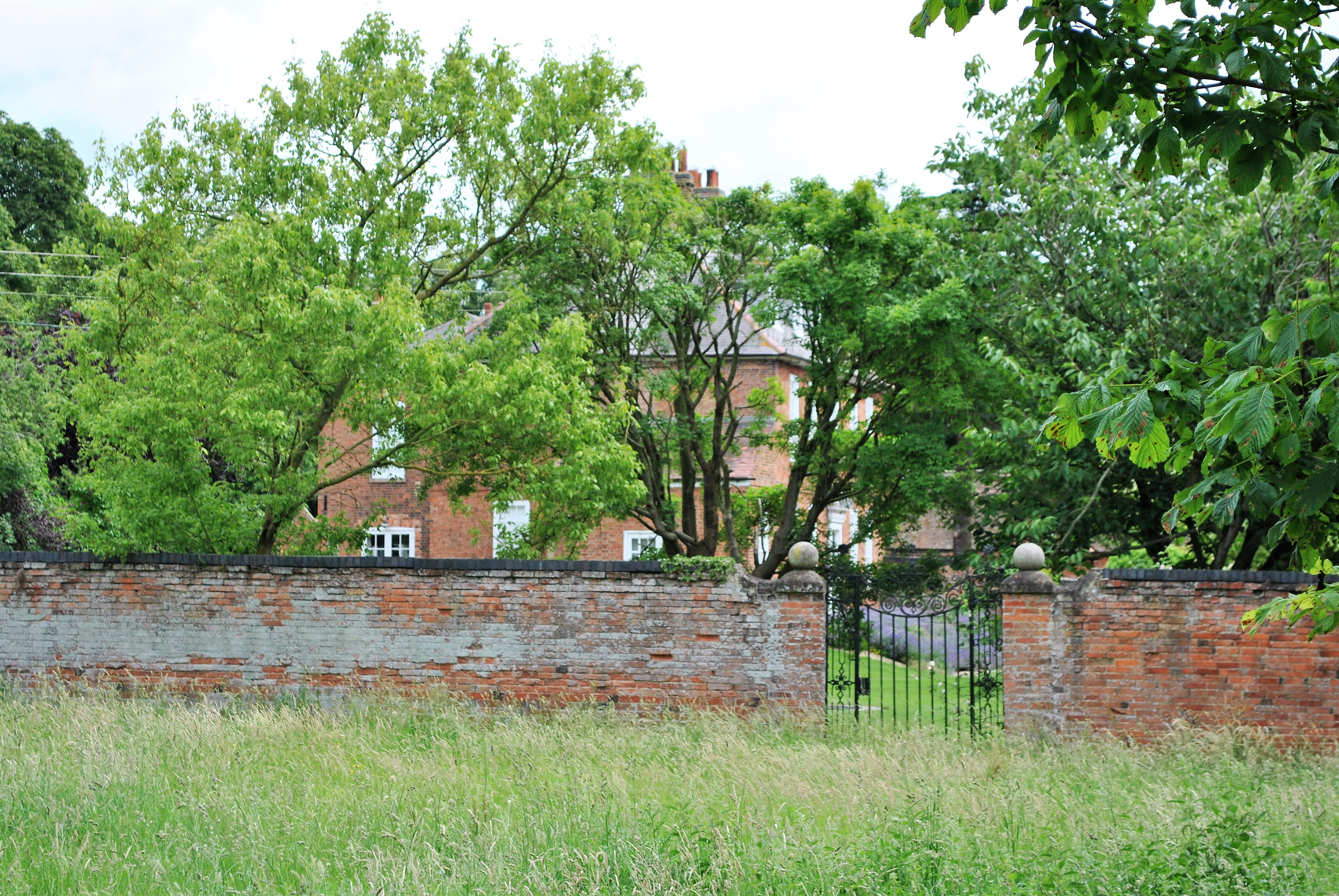
Samuel Butler's birthplace and childhood home

Butler was born on 4 December 1835 at the rectory in the village of Langar, Nottinghamshire. His father was Rev. Thomas Butler, son of Dr. Samuel Butler, then headmaster of Shrewsbury School and later Bishop of Lichfield. Dr. Butler was the son of a tradesman and descended from a line of yeomen; despite his family's social class, his scholarly aptitude was recognised at a young age, and he was sent to Rugby and Cambridge, where he distinguished himself.

His only son, Thomas, wished to go into the Navy but succumbed to paternal pressure and entered the Anglican clergy, in which he led an undistinguished career, in contrast to his father's. Samuel's immediate family created for him an oppressive home environment (chronicled in The Way of All Flesh). Thomas Butler, states Samuel Butler's biographer, "to make up for having been a servile son ... became a bullying father".

Samuel Butler's relations with his parents, especially with his father, were largely antagonistic. His education began at home and included frequent beatings, as was not uncommon at the time. Samuel wrote later that his parents were "brutal and stupid by nature". He later recorded that his father "never liked me, nor I him; from my earliest recollections I can call to mind no time when I did not fear him and dislike him ... I have never passed a day without thinking of him many times over as the man who was sure to be against me." Under his parents' influence, he was set on course to follow his father into the priesthood.

He was sent to Shrewsbury School at age twelve, where he did not enjoy the hard life under its headmaster Benjamin Hall Kennedy, whom he later drew as "Dr. Skinner" in The Way of All Flesh. Then, in 1854, he went up to St John's College, Cambridge, where he obtained a first in Classics in 1858. The graduate society of St John's is named the Samuel Butler Room (SBR) in his honour.

== Career ==
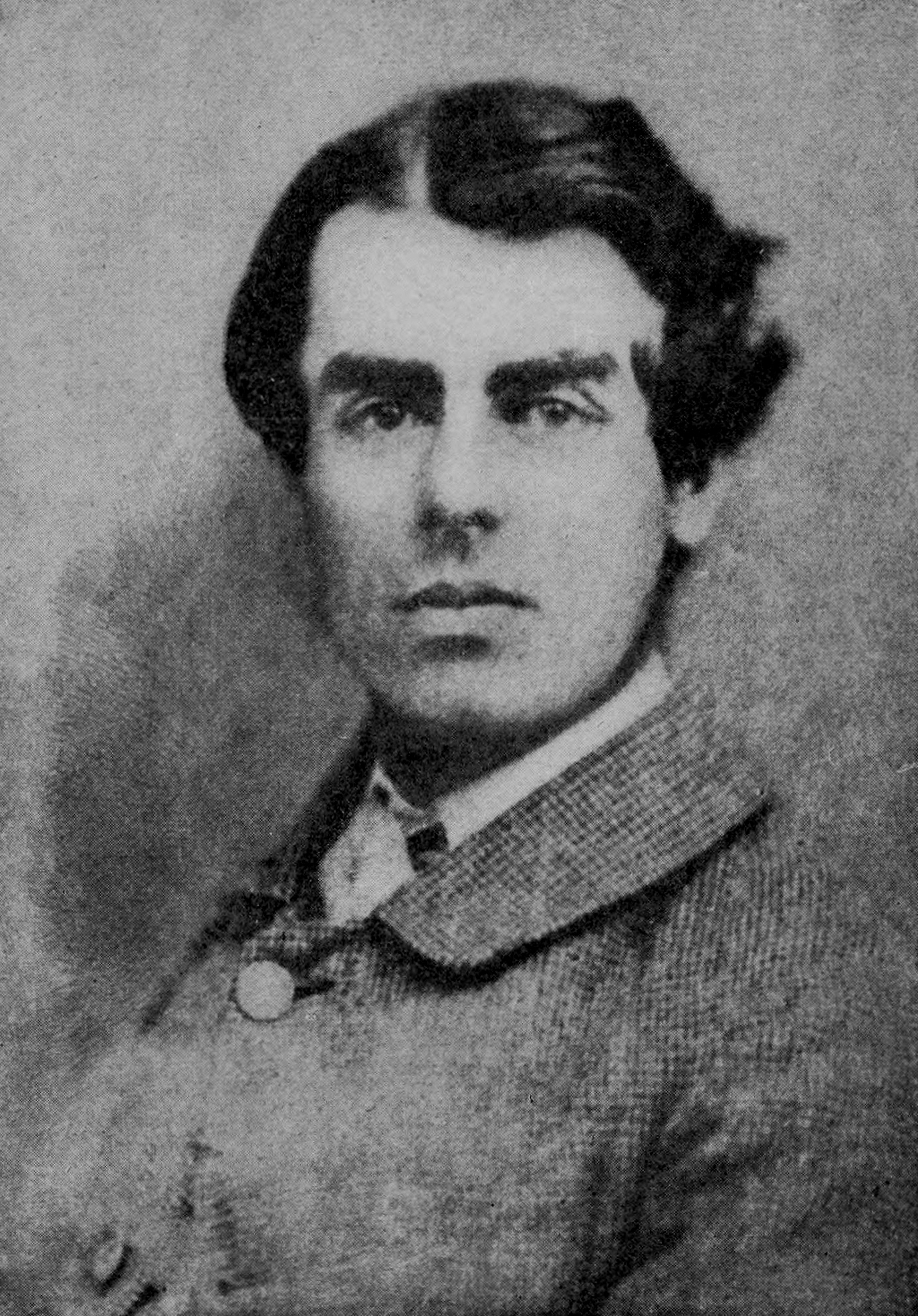
Butler at the age of 23, in 1858

After Cambridge, he went to live in a low-income parish in London 1858–1859 as preparation for his ordination into the Anglican clergy; there he discovered that infant baptism made no apparent difference to the morals and behaviour of his peers and began questioning his faith. This experience would later serve as inspiration for his work The Fair Haven. Correspondence with his father about the issue failed to set his mind at peace, instead inciting his father's wrath. As a result, he emigrated to New Zealand, leaving on the ship Roman Emperor on 1 October 1859 and arriving on 27 January 1860.

Butler went there, like many early British settlers of materially privileged origins, to maximise distance between himself and his family. He wrote of his arrival and life as a sheep farmer on Mesopotamia Station in A First Year in Canterbury Settlement (1863), and he made a handsome profit when he sold his farm, but his chief achievement during his time there consisted of drafts and source material for much of his masterpiece Erewhon.

Erewhon revealed Butler's long interest in Darwin's theories of biological evolution. In 1863, four years after Darwin published On the Origin of Species, the editor of a New Zealand newspaper, The Press, published a letter captioned "Darwin among the Machines", written by Butler, but signed Cellarius. It compares human evolution to machine evolution, prophesying that machines would eventually replace humans in the supremacy of the earth: "In the course of ages we shall find ourselves the inferior race". The letter raises many of the themes now debated by proponents of the technological singularity, for example that computers evolve much faster than humans and that we are racing toward an unknowable future through explosive technological change.

Butler wrote four books arguing against Darwin's theory of natural selection (though not from a religious point of view). Butler, like Darwin, was the grandson of a distinguished grandfather, the earlier Samuel Butler, whose biography Butler wrote. Butler believed that Darwin had not sufficiently acknowledged his own grandfather Erasmus Darwin's contribution to his theory.

Butler returned to England in 1864, settling in rooms in Clifford's Inn (near Fleet Street), where he lived for the rest of his life. In 1872, the utopian novel Erewhon appeared anonymously, causing speculation as to who the author was. When Butler revealed himself, Erewhon made him well known, more because of this speculation than for its undisputed literary merits.

He was less successful when he lost money investing in a Canadian steamship company and in the Canada Tanning Extract Company, in which he and his friend Charles Pauli were made nominal directors. In 1874 Butler went to Canada, "fighting fraud of every kind" in an attempt to save the company, which collapsed, reducing his own capital to £2,000.

In 1839 his grandfather Dr. Butler had left Samuel property at Whitehall in Abbey Foregate, Shrewsbury, so long as he survived his own father and his aunt, Dr. Butler's daughter Harriet Lloyd. While at Cambridge in 1857 he sold the Whitehall mansion and six acres to his cousin Thomas Bucknall Lloyd, but kept the remaining land surrounding the mansion. When in the 1870s his old Shrewsbury School proposed to relocate to a site at Whitehall, Butler publicly opposed it and the school ultimately moved elsewhere. His aunt died in 1880 and his father's death in 1886 resolved his financial problems for the last 16 years of his own life. The land at Whitehall was sold for housing development; he laid out and named four roads – Bishop and Canon Streets after his grandfather's and father's clerical titles, Clifford Street after his London home, and Alfred Street in gratitude to his clerk.

Butler indulged himself, holidaying in Italy every summer and while there, producing his works on the Italian landscape and art. His close interest in the art of the Sacri Monti is reflected in Alps and Sanctuaries of Piedmont and the Canton Ticino (1881) and Ex Voto (1888). He wrote other books, including Erewhon Revisited, a sequel to Erewhon that was less successful than the original. His semi-autobiographical novel, The Way of All Flesh, did not appear in print until after his death, as he considered its tone of satirical attack on Victorian morality too contentious at the time. Its original manuscript, with its original title, Ernest Pontifex or the Way of All Flesh, was not published until 1964.

== Death ==
Butler died on 18 June 1902, aged 66, in a nursing home in St. John's Wood Road, London. By his wish, he was cremated at Woking Crematorium, and by differing accounts, his ashes were dispersed or buried in an unmarked grave.

The Way of All Flesh was published after Butler's death by his literary executor, R. A. Streatfeild, in 1903. This version, however, altered Butler's text in many ways and cut important material. The manuscript was edited by Daniel F. Howard as Ernest Pontifex or The Way of All Flesh (Butler's original title) and published for the first time in 1964.

== Sexual orientation ==
Butler's romantic and sexual orientation has been the subject of academic speculation and debate. Butler never married, although for years he made regular visits to a woman, Lucie Dumas. Herbert Sussman, having arrived at the conclusion that Butler was attracted to his own sex, opined that Butler's sexual association with Dumas was merely an outlet for his "intense same-sex desire". Sussman's theory calls Butler's assumption of "bachelorhood" merely a means to retain middle-class respectability in the absence of matrimony; he observes that there is no evidence of Butler's having any "genital contact with other men", but alleges that the "temptations of overstepping the line strained his close male relationships".

His first significant male friendship was with the young Charles Pauli, son of a German businessman in London, whom Butler met in New Zealand. They returned to England together in 1864 and took neighbouring apartments in Clifford's Inn. Butler had made a large profit from the sale of his New Zealand farm and undertook to finance Pauli's study of law by paying him a regular sum, which Butler continued to do long after the friendship had cooled, until Butler had spent all his savings. On Pauli's death in 1892, Butler was shocked to learn that Pauli had benefited from similar arrangements with other men and had died wealthy, but without leaving Butler anything in his will.

After 1878, Butler became close friends with Henry Festing Jones, whom he persuaded to give up his job as a solicitor to be his personal literary assistant and travelling companion, at a salary of £200 a year. Although Jones kept his own lodgings at Barnard's Inn, the two men saw each other daily until Butler's death in 1902, collaborating on music and writing projects in the daytime, and attending concerts and theatres in the evenings; they also frequently toured Italy and other favorite parts of Europe together. After Butler's death, Jones edited Butler's notebooks for publication and published his own biography of him in 1919.

Another friendship was with Hans Rudolf Faesch, a Swiss student who stayed with Butler and Jones in London for two years, improving his English, before departing for Singapore. Both Butler and Jones wept when they saw him off at the railway station in early 1895, and Butler subsequently wrote an emotional poem, "In Memoriam H. R. F.", instructing his literary agent to offer it for publication to several leading English magazines. However, once the Oscar Wilde trial began in the spring of that year, with revelations of same-sex relations among the literati, Butler feared being associated with the widely reported scandal and in a panic wrote to all the magazines, withdrawing his poem.

Some critics, beginning with Malcolm Muggeridge in The Earnest Atheist: A Study of Samuel Butler (1936), concluded that Butler had sublimated or repressed his same-sex attraction and that his lifelong status as an "incarnate bachelor" was comparable to that of his writer contemporaries Walter Pater, Henry James, and E. M. Forster, also thought to be same-sex attracted.

== Philosophy and personal thought ==
Whether in his satire or fiction, Butler's studies on the evidence for Christianity, his works on evolutionary thought, or in his miscellaneous other writings, a consistent theme runs through, stemming largely from his personal struggle against the stifling of his own nature by his parents, which led him to seek more general principles of growth, development, and purpose: "What concerned him was to establish his nature, his aspirations, and their fulfillment upon a philosophic basis, to identify them with the nature, the aspirations, the fulfillment of all humanity – and, more than that, with the fulfillment of the universe ... His struggle became generalized, symbolic, tremendous."

The form that this search took was principally philosophical and – given the interests of the day – biological: "Satirist, novelist, artist, and critic that he was, he was primarily a philosopher", and in particular, a philosopher who looked for biological foundations for his work: "His biology was a bridge to a philosophy of life, which sought a scientific basis for religion, and endowed a naturalistically conceived universe with a soul." Indeed, "philosophical writer" was ultimately the self-description Butler chose as most fitting to his work.

=== Homer ===
Butler developed a theory that the Odyssey came from the pen of a young Sicilian woman, and that the scenes of the poem reflected the coast of Sicily (especially the territory of Trapani) and its nearby islands. He described his evidence for this in The Authoress of the Odyssey (1897) and in the introduction and footnotes to his prose translation of the Odyssey (1900). Robert Graves elaborated on the hypothesis in his novel Homer's Daughter.

Butler argued in a lecture entitled "The Humour of Homer", delivered at The Working Men's College in London, 1892, that Homer's deities in the Iliad are like humans, but "without the virtue", and that he "must have desired his listeners not to take them seriously". Butler translated the Iliad (1898). His other works include Shakespeare's Sonnets Reconsidered (1899), a theory that the sonnets, if rearranged, tell a story about a same-sex affair.

=== Theology ===
In a book of essays published after his death, entitled God the Known and God the Unknown, Samuel Butler argued for the existence of a single, corporeal deity, declaring belief in an incorporeal deity to be essentially the same as atheism. He asserted that this "body" of God was, in fact, composed of the bodies of all living things on earth, a belief that may be classed as "panzoism". He later changed his views, and decided that God was composed not only of all living things, but of all non-living things as well. He argued, however, that "some vaster Person [may] loom ... out behind our God, and ... stand in relation to him as he to us. And behind this vaster and more unknown God there may be yet another, and another, and another."

=== Heredity ===
Butler argued that each organism was not, in fact, distinct from its parents. Instead, he asserted that each being was merely an extension of its parents at a later stage of evolution. "Birth", he once quipped, "has been made too much of."

=== Evolution ===
Butler wrote four books on evolution: Life and Habit; Evolution, Old and New; Unconscious Memory; and Luck, or Cunning, As the Main Means of Organic Modification?. Butler accepted evolution but rejected Darwin's theory of natural selection. In his book Evolution, Old and New (1879), he accused Darwin of borrowing heavily from Buffon, Erasmus Darwin and Lamarck, while playing down these influences and giving them little credit. In 1912, the biologist Vernon Kellogg summed up Butler's views:

Butler, though strongly anti-Darwinian (that is, anti-natural selection and anti-Charles Darwin) is not anti-evolutionist. He professes, indeed, to be very much of an evolutionist, and in particular one who has taken it upon his shoulders to reinstate Buffon and Erasmus Darwin, and, as a follower of these two, Lamarck, in their rightful place as the most believable explainers of the factors and method of evolution. His evolution belief is a sort of Butlerized Lamarckism, tracing back originally to Buffon and Erasmus Darwin.

Historian Peter J. Bowler has described Butler as a defender of neo-Lamarckian evolution. Bowler noted that "Butler began to see in Lamarckism the prospect of retaining an indirect form of the design argument. Instead of creating from without, God might exist within the process of living development, represented by its innate creativity."

Butler's writings on evolution were criticised by scientists. Critics have pointed out that Butler admitted to be writing entertainment rather than science, and his writings were not taken seriously by most professional biologists. Butler's books were negatively reviewed in Nature by George Romanes and Alfred Russel Wallace. Romanes stated that Butler's views on evolution had no basis in science.

Gregory Bateson often mentioned Butler and saw value in some of his ideas, calling him "the ablest contemporary critic of Darwinian evolution". He noted Butler's insight into the efficiencies of habit formation (patterns of behaviour and mental processes) in adapting to an environment:

[M]ind and pattern as the explanatory principles, which, above all, required investigation, were pushed out of biological thinking in the later evolutionary theories, which were developed in the mid-nineteenth century by Darwin, Huxley, etc. There were still some naughty boys, like Samuel Butler, who said that mind could not be ignored in this way – but they were weak voices, and, incidentally, they never looked at organisms. I don't think Butler ever looked at anything except his own cat, but he still knew more about evolution than some of the more conventional thinkers.

Butler and Darwin "argued fiercely in the last years of Darwin's life over the text of a biography [by Darwin] of Dr. Erasmus Darwin [Charles Darwin's grandfather] ... It ended in complete personal estrangement".

=== Music ===
In Ernest Pontifex or The Way of All Flesh, protagonist Ernest Pontifex says that he had been trying all his life to like modern music but succeeded less and less as he grew older. On being asked when he considers modern music to have begun, he says, "with Sebastian Bach". Butler liked only Handel and, when offering to review concerts, said: "but I only want Handel's Oratorios—I would have added 'and things of that sort', but there are no 'things of that sort' except Handel's". With Henry Festing Jones, Butler composed choral works that Eric Blom characterised as "imitation Handel", although with satirical texts. Two of the works they collaborated on were the cantatas Narcissus (private rehearsal 1886, published 1888), and Ulysses (published posthumously in 1904), both for solo voices, chorus, and orchestra. George Bernard Shaw wrote in a private letter that the music was invested with "a ridiculously complete command of the Handelian manner and technique". Around 1871 Butler was engaged as music critic by The Drawing Room Gazette. From 1890 he took counterpoint lessons with W. S. Rockstro.

== Legacy and influence ==
Butler's friend Henry Festing Jones wrote the authoritative biography: the two-volume Samuel Butler, Author of Erewhon (1835–1902): A Memoir (commonly known as Jones's Memoir), published in 1919, and reissued by HardPress Publishing in 2013. Project Gutenberg hosts a shorter "Sketch" by Jones, first published in 1913 in The Humour of Homer and Other Essays and reissued in its own volume 1921 by Jonathan Cape as Samuel Butler: A Sketch. The most recent biography of Butler is Peter Raby's Samuel Butler: A Biography (Hogarth Press, 1991; University of Iowa Press, 1991).

Butler belonged to no literary school and spawned no followers in his lifetime. He was a serious but amateur student of the subjects he undertook, especially religious orthodoxy and evolutionary thought, and his controversial assertions effectively shut him out from both the opposing factions of church and science that played such a large role in late Victorian cultural life: "In those days one was either a religionist or a Darwinian, but he was neither."

His influence on literature, such as it was, came through The Way of All Flesh, which Butler completed in the 1880s, but left unpublished to protect his family. Yet the novel "begun in 1870 and not touched after 1885, was so modern when it was published in 1903, that it may be said to have started a new school", particularly in its foreshadowing the use of psychoanalysis in fiction, in "his treatment of Ernest Pontifex".

Sue Zemka writes that "Among science fiction writers, The Book of the Machines has a canonical status, for it originates the conceit by which machines develop intelligent capacities and enslave mankind." For example, in Frank Herbert's Dune the "Butlerian Jihad" – "in-universe ancient revolt against 'thinking machines' that resulted in their prohibition" – is named after Butler.

The English novelist Aldous Huxley acknowledged the influence of Erewhon on his novel Brave New World. Huxley's utopian counterpart to Brave New World, Island, also refers prominently to Erewhon. In From Dawn to Decadence, Jacques Barzun asks: "Could a man do more to bewilder the public?"

== Main works ==
- "Darwin among the Machines" (1863, largely incorporated into Erewhon)
- Lucubratio Ebria (1865)
- Erewhon, or Over the Range (1872)
- Life and Habit (1878). Trubner (reissued by Cambridge University Press, 2009; ISBN 978-1-108-00551-7)
- Evolution, Old and New; Or, the Theories of Buffon, Dr. Erasmus Darwin, and Lamarck, as compared with that of Charles Darwin (1879)
- Unconscious Memory (1880)
- Alps and Sanctuaries of Piedmont and the Canton Ticino (1881)
- Luck, or Cunning, As the Main Means of Organic Modification? (1887)
- Ex Voto; An Account of the Sacro Monte or New Jerusalem at Verallo-Sesia. With some notice of Tabachetti's remaining work at the Sanctuary of Crea (1888)
- The Life and Letters of Dr. Samuel Butler, Head-Master of Shrewsbury School 1798–1836, and Afterwards Bishop of Lichfield, In So Far as They Illustrate the Scholastic, Religious, and Social Life of England, 1790–1840. By His Grandson, Samuel Butler (1896, two volumes)
- The Authoress of the Odyssey (1897)
- The Iliad of Homer, Rendered into English Prose (1898)
- Shakespeare's Sonnets Reconsidered (1899)
- The Odyssey of Homer, Rendered into English Prose (1900)
- Erewhon Revisited Twenty Years Later: Both by the Original Discoverer of the Country and by His Son (1901)
- The Way of All Flesh (1903), text of original manuscript published as Ernest Pontifex or The Way of All Flesh (1964)
- God the Known and God the Unknown (1909). This is a revised edition, posthumously published. R.A. Streatfeild's "Prefatory Note" to it states that the original edition "first appeared in the form of a series of articles which were published in 'The Examiner' in May, June and July, 1879."
- The Note-Books of Samuel Butler Selections arranged and edited by Henry Festing Jones (1912)
- Further Extracts from the Note-Books of Samuel Butler chosen and edited by A.T. Bartholomew (1934)
- Samuel Butler's Notebooks Selections edited by Geoffrey Keynes and Brian Hill (1951)
- The Family Letters of Samuel Butler 1841–1886 Selected, Edited and Introduced by Arnold Silver (1962)
- Howard, Daniel F., ed. (1962). The Correspondence of Samuel Butler with His Sister May. Berkeley and Los Angeles: University of California Press.
- The Fair Haven (attributed to 'John Pickard Owen', 1873, new edition 1913, revised and corrected edition 1923; considers inconsistencies between the Gospels)
- A First Year in Canterbury Settlement With Other Early Essays (1914)
- Selected Essays (1927)
- Butleriana, A. T. Bartholomew, ed. (1932). The Nonesuch Press
- The Essential Samuel Butler selected with an introduction by G. D. H. Cole (1950)
- Quis Desiderio..? with engravings by Phillida Gili (1987) Libanus Press
