= Impact events in fiction =

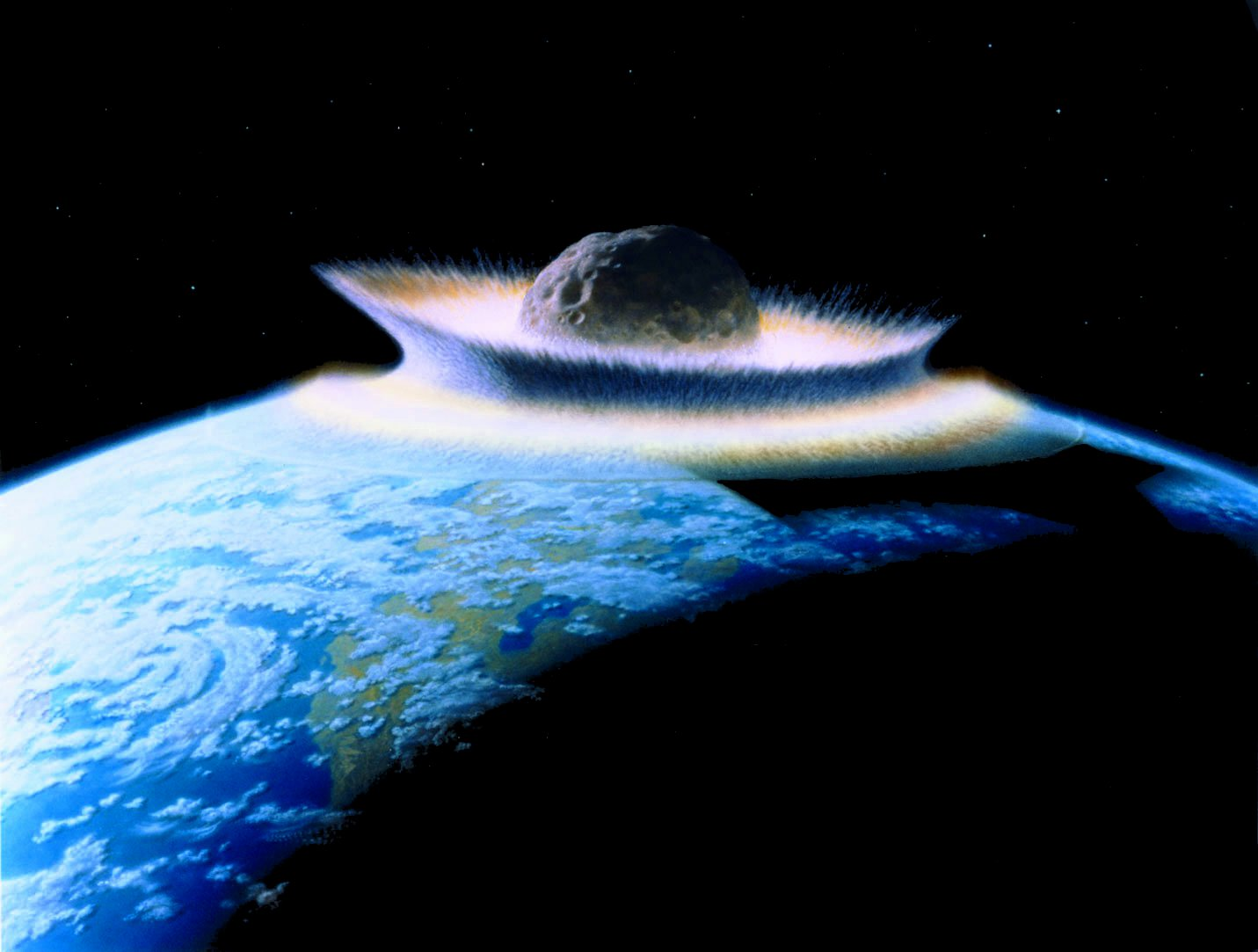
Artist's depiction of an apocalyptic impact event

Impact events have been a recurring theme in fiction since the 1800s. The popularity has varied in waves; periods of increased interest include the 1890s fin de siècle era, the years following the 1910 appearance of Halley's Comet, and the concluding part of the century following the 1980 publication of the Alvarez hypothesis about the extinction of the dinosaurs and the 1994 collision of Comet Shoemaker–Levy 9 with Jupiter. Impact events by asteroids or comets are a common disaster scenario, and ones caused by larger objects such as rogue planets or the Moon also appear on occasion. Stories about impact events often focus on the societal impacts, and efforts to prevent the collision are common. Variations on the theme include placing the impact in the past, near misses instead of direct collisions, and other celestial bodies than the Earth such as the Moon or Sun being struck. In some stories impact events are caused intentionally, be it to be used as a weapon or as a tool for terraforming. The 1908 Tunguska event—an enormous explosion in a remote region of Siberia generally held to have been caused by a meteor air burst—has also appeared in many works of fiction.

== History ==
Impact events have been a recurring theme in fiction since the 1800s. David Pringle, in The Ultimate Encyclopedia of Science Fiction, attributes the emergence of the theme at this time to two advancements in astronomy: the discovery that meteors ("shooting stars") are caused by objects from space entering Earth's atmosphere, and a more acute appreciation of just how many objects exist within the Solar System. Brian Stableford, in Science Fact and Science Fiction: An Encyclopedia, similarly points to comets starting to be discovered by telescope (as opposed to the naked eye) following the first such detection by Maria Mitchell in 1835, and the resulting realization that comets were significantly more common than previously thought. The earliest stories tended to depict impacts by comets, (Note: Comets have a long history of being associated with disaster, stretching back to at least the year 1200, but the conception of comets as a purely natural—as opposed to supernatural—source of destruction did not emerge until the second half of the 1700s with the work of French astronomer Jérôme Lalande.) though other objects such as asteroids and meteoroids became more common in the 1900s.

Dorian Lynskey, in Everything Must Go: The Stories We Tell About the End of the World, comments that the theme's popularity has varied in waves. One of the periods of increased interest was the 1890s, when doom and gloom in general became more fashionable as part of the broader cultural phenomenon known as fin de siècle. The 1910 appearance of Halley's Comet was followed by the first film depictions of apocalyptic impact events, the first being the Edison Film Company's 1910 short film The Comet and the first feature being the Danish 1916 film Verdens Undergang. The effect of the advent of the atomic bomb on the popularity of fiction about impact events following World War II has variously been posited to have been positive, with the widespread fear of sudden cataclysmic events in the form of nuclear anxiety, and negative, with the emerging expectation that the collective death of humanity would be self-inflicted. In the latter part of the century, the impact theme received successive boosts in popularity with the 1980 publication of the Alvarez hypothesis, which posits that the extinction of the dinosaurs 65 million years ago was caused by an asteroid impact that created the Chicxulub crater off the coast of Mexico, and with the collision of Comet Shoemaker–Levy 9 with Jupiter in 1994. The latter in particular is credited with inspiring a large number of disaster films and other on-screen portrayals of impact events or threats thereof in the years that followed.

== Disaster ==
Comets and asteroids are interchangeable in impact fiction, and with good reason. [...] Despite their differences, the effect of a significant collision with the Earth would be much the same [...] The Earth's surface would cease to sustain life.

— Dorian Lynskey, 2021

Impact events are a common disaster scenario in fiction. Lynskey considers "impact fiction" a distinct subgenre within apocalyptic fiction, one wherein several recurring tropes can be identified, such as the character archetype of the astronomer whose warnings go unheeded—in Lynskey's view, a kind of equivalent of Cassandra in classical mythology. Lynskey writes that the exact nature of the impactor—asteroid, comet, planet, and so on—varies significantly between works, the defining characteristic of the subgenre being the devastating effect of the impact. Science fiction critic Dylan Roth attributes the theme's popularity in part to its simplicity as a plot device, without the need for more elaborate setup; Andrew Sawyer, in The Greenwood Encyclopedia of Science Fiction and Fantasy, similarly gives impact events as an example of a disaster scenario with no antagonistic will behind it and comments that the science fiction genre largely has a monopoly on such scenarios. Lynskey posits that the impact motif is appealing to storytellers due to a versatility in the types of stories that can be told—whether character-driven drama, black comedy, or pure spectacle. Stableford writes that by the beginning of the new millennium, asteroidal impact events and climate change were the two most popular scenarios in apocalyptic fiction; Lynskey comments that disaster stories after the turn of the millennium, whether about impact events or not, typically have a climate change subtext—comparing it to the influence nuclear weapons had on science fiction following World War II.

Lynskey identifies the "impact fiction" subgenre as beginning with Edgar Allan Poe's 1839 short story "The Conversation of Eiros and Charmion", deeming it "the first stab at a scientifically plausible impact narrative". In the story, part of the Earth's atmosphere is lost to a comet's tail, followed by the comet nucleus impacting the planet. In Camille Flammarion's 1894 novel Omega: The Last Days of the World, scientists speculate on the various ways a comet impact could lead to humanity's extinction, though the event itself turns out to be survivable; a loose film adaptation by Abel Gance called End of the World was released in 1931. The 1977 novel Lucifer's Hammer by Larry Niven and Jerry Pournelle revolves around a highly destructive impact event and its aftermath; astronomer Andrew Fraknoi describes it as being "among the first of the scientifically reasonable impact stories". In the 1988 novel Land's End by Jack Williamson and Frederik Pohl, a comet strike destroys the Earth's ozone layer, rendering the surface of the planet uninhabitable for humanity and forcing a migration beneath the oceans.

=== Societal impact ===
P. Andrew Karam, in Comets: Nature and Culture, comments that stories of cometary impact events have largely focused less on the scientific aspect and more on the societal ramifications, even in works by authors who might be expected to take a greater interest in the science such as Flammarion and Niven. Pringle further notes that the depicted reactions differ significantly between works. In Flammarion's novel, the public largely ignores or denies the impending disaster. In Edgar Wallace's 1926 novel The Day of Uniting, humanity responds to the looming cometary threat with unprecedented unity. In Austrian Jewish playwright Jura Soyfer's satirical 1936 play The End of the World, a scientist tries to mount a response to a comet heading for Earth to avert utter annihilation, to no avail—among other unhelpful responses, Hitler declares "Destroying everybody is my business". Dennis Wheatley's 1939 novel Sixty Days to Live depicts the lead-up to an expected catastrophic collision by a comet with Earth, which is received with widespread panic. In Max Ehrlich's 1949 novel The Big Eye, the anticipation of a world-ending collision leads to universal nuclear disarmament. The 2010s were marked by a number of stories about people deciding how to spend their last time on Earth when all hope of survival has been lost, including the 2012 film Seeking a Friend for the End of the World and the 2013 film These Final Hours.

=== Impact prevention ===
Attempts to avert impending impact events appear in many stories. In George Griffith's 1897 short story "The Great Crellin Comet" (later expanded into the 1907 novel The World Peril of 1910), humanity constructs cannons to fire at a comet heading for Earth in order to avert disaster. In the 1916–1917 serial "The Moonmaker" by Arthur Cheney Train and Robert W. Wood, an errant asteroid is diverted to enter Earth orbit as an additional natural satellite instead of striking the Earth, a plot point that recurs in Isaac R. Nathanson's 1930 short story "The Falling Planetoid". Superman stops an asteroid impact in the 1953 episode "Panic in the Sky" of the television series Adventures of Superman. In Arthur C. Clarke's 1973 novel Rendezvous with Rama, a disastrous impact motivates humanity to keep close track of Solar System objects thereafter to be able to deflect them, (Note: The name of the fictional early warning system—"Project SPACEGUARD"—was later used for NASA's real-world project for tracking near-Earth objects (NEOs), launched in 1992: Spaceguard.) and his 1993 novel The Hammer of God revolves around efforts to avert such a disaster. The 1979 film Meteor depicts a joint US–USSR endeavour to deflect an approaching impactor using nuclear weapons, inspired by the real-world 1967 MIT report Project Icarus; Lynskey comments that nuclear weapons being portrayed as a force for good was an unusual experience for viewers at the time. The year 1998 saw two films—Armageddon and Deep Impact—depicting attempts to disintegrate large impactors using nuclear weapons; Lynskey and astrophysicist Steven D. Bloom both note that this would in all likelihood merely turn one large impact into several smaller ones and result in utter devastation nonetheless. The 2021 film Don't Look Up uses the impact aversion motif as a vehicle for satire, where humanity's inept handling of the situation serves as an allegory for real-world efforts to combat climate change.

=== In the past ===
Some stories place the impact events in the past. George Allan England's 1912–1913 serial Darkness and Dawn is a post-apocalyptic story where the exact cause of destruction is never specified but there is a crater hundreds of miles wide and deep in the former Midwestern United States; Gary Westfahl comments in Science Fiction Literature Through History: An Encyclopedia that this suggests an asteroid impact. In Jack Bechdolt's 1920 novel The Torch, an impact event similarly forms part of the backstory for the post-apocalyptic setting. In Walter Kateley's 1930 short story "The World of a Hundred Men", a record of an inhabited asteroid's history leading up to its collision with Earth is found underneath Meteor Crater in Arizona. In Nelson S. Bond's 1940 novel Exiles of Time, time travellers to the past attempt to avert a cometary disaster. Stephen Baxter's 2002 novel Evolution depicts the Chicxulub impact leading to the demise of the dinosaurs, while Charles L. Harness's 2000 time travel story "A Boost in Time" depicts an attempt to save them from extinction by diverting the impactor.

=== Larger impactors ===
Fictional impact events from more massive celestial objects also appear on occasion. One such motif is of rogue planets—planets that do not orbit the Sun nor any other star—entering the Solar System on a collision course with Earth. A pair of rogue planets in Edwin Balmer and Philip Wylie's 1933 novel When Worlds Collide (the 1951 film adaptation substitutes a star and its planet) thus leaves evacuation to one of them as the only hope of survival for a small portion of humanity. In the 2011 film Melancholia, the threat is from the titular giant planet and the focus on the psychological impact on a small number of characters. The Moon serves the impactor role in R. C. Sherriff's 1939 novel The Hopkins Manuscript and the 2022 film Moonfall.

=== Near misses ===
Beyond direct collisions, near misses are also common. A comet that grazes the Earth's surface carries several humans with it on its continued trajectory through the Solar System in Jules Verne's 1877 novel Hector Servadac. In H. G. Wells's 1897 short story "The Star", the close approach of the titular object to Earth causes natural disasters, intense heating, and millions of deaths. In Tove Jansson's 1946 Moomin novel Comet in Moominland, a predicted impact instead turns out a near miss, but heat from the comet nevertheless results in a drought. In Fritz Leiber's 1964 novel The Wanderer, the close passage of another planet wreaks havoc on Earth through its gravitational effects.

=== Impacting elsewhere ===
Besides Earth, impact events may also strike other celestial objects. In Robert Duncan Milne's 1882 short story duology "Into the Sun" and "Plucked from the Burning", society collapses when Earth undergoes a global heat wave as a result of a comet striking the Sun. Collisions with the Moon pose threats to humanity in Jack McDevitt's 1998 novel Moonfall, where the impact shatters the Moon and spreads debris towards Earth, and Susan Beth Pfeffer's 2006–2013 The Last Survivors series, where it alters the Moon's orbit and causes weather patterns on Earth to be disrupted.

== Induced and exploited ==
Some stories depict impact events being caused by conscious action. Weaponized comets appear in the 1985 Doctor Who serial "Attack of the Cybermen" and the 1998 episode "Little Girl Lost" of Superman: The Animated Series, in both of which the villains redirect comets towards Earth. Similarly, Earth is targeted with asteroids by aliens as a form of interplanetary warfare in Robert A. Heinlein's 1959 novel Starship Troopers, Niven and Pournelle's 1985 novel Footfall, and David Feintuch's 1996 novel Fisherman's Hope. A human redirects asteroids from the distant Oort cloud towards Earth in an act of attempted mass murder in Don Bingle's 2002 short story "Patience", and an asteroid is set on a collision course with one of the moons of Neptune to create an additional planetary ring in Alastair Reynolds's 2012 short story "Vainglory", while another human-caused—but this time unintentional—impact event appears in Baxter's 1997 novel Titan. The asteroid Ceres is deliberately crashed into the Moon in Bob Shaw's 1981 novel The Ceres Solution.

Comets, being plentiful in certain compounds—particularly water—have been depicted as useful resources for terraforming. Intentional cometary collisions with Mars are thus used for the terraforming of Mars in Frederik Pohl's 1992 novel Mining the Oort and Kim Stanley Robinson's 1992–1996 Mars trilogy. Similarly, in Marcus Chown and John Gribbin's 1984 novel Double Planet, a comet heading for Earth is diverted to instead strike the Moon and thus create a rudimentary lunar atmosphere, while in the 1989 anime film Venus Wars, a natural comet strike on Venus makes for a thinner atmosphere and a higher level of humidity, providing the necessary conditions for further terraforming of the planet.

== Tunguska event ==
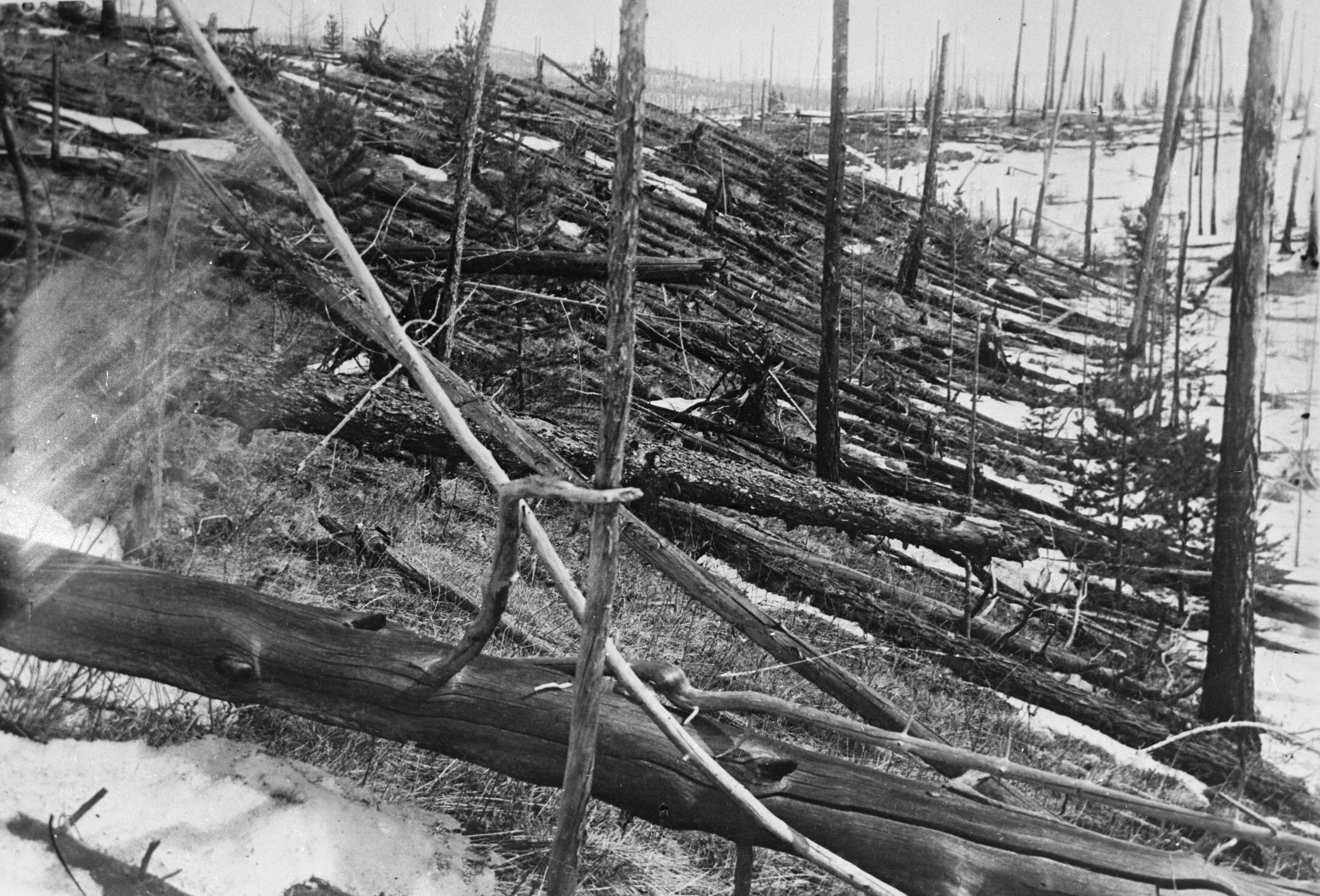
Trees felled by the 1908 Tunguska event

The 1908 Tunguska event—an enormous explosion in a remote region of Siberia—has appeared in many works of fiction. It is generally held to have been caused by a meteor air burst, though several alternative explanations have been proposed both in scientific circles and in fiction. A popular one in fiction is that it was caused by an alien spaceship, possibly first put forth in Ed Earl Repp's 1930 short story "The Second Missile". It gained prominence following the publication of Russian science fiction writer Alexander Kazantsev's 1946 short story "Explosion"; inspired by the similarities between the event and the nuclear bombing of Hiroshima, Kazantsev's story posits that a nuclear explosion in the engine of a spacecraft was responsible. An alien spacecraft is also the explanation in Polish science fiction writer Stanisław Lem's 1951 novel The Astronauts and its 1960 film adaptation The Silent Star, while a human-made one is to blame in Ian Watson's 1983 novel Chekhov's Journey. Additional variations on the spaceship theme appear in Donald R. Bensen's 1978 novel And Having Writ... and Algis Budrys's 1993 novel Hard Landing, among others. Another proposed explanation is that the cause was the impact of a micro black hole, as in Niven's 1975 short story "The Borderland of Sol". Some stories nevertheless accept the conventional meteorite explanation, such as the 1996 The X-Files episode "Tunguska" that instead revolves around the impact possibly having introduced alien microbial life to Earth.

== See also ==
- Disasters in popular culture
- Solar System in fiction
