= Moonfall (novel) =

1998 novel by Jack McDevitt

- First edition
- Author: Jack McDevitt
- Cover artist: John Ennis
- Language: English
- Genre: Science fiction
- Publisher: HarperPrism
- Publication date: 9 December 1998
- Pages: 560 (paperback)
- ISBN: 978-0061051128

Moonfall is a 1998 hard science fiction novel by American writer Jack McDevitt. The book depicts the impact of an interstellar comet on the Moon and how the catastrophic effects are handled. The novel was nominated for the Nebula Award for Best Novel in 1998.

== Plot summary ==
In 2024, Charlie Haskell, the vice president of the United States, is on the Moon to inaugurate the first moonbase. An interstellar comet is discovered to be on course to impact the Moon and shatter it. A rescue mission gets underway to take the thousand-something population of the base off the Moon, with the support of the L1 space station (near the Earth-Moon L1 point) and Skyport, a larger geocentric space station.

Haskell, in a moment of zealousness to show responsibility, promises the public to get off the Moon only after everyone else has. Subsequent analysis reveals that the existing rescue plan would result in about 10 people not being able to get off the Moon before the impact. The VP chooses to stick to his promise. Some volunteers, along with a few randomly selected people, also stay back.

The rescue plan moves along, with the help of about five large spaceships, 'SSTOs'. The SSTOs dock with smaller ferry spaceships, 'moonbuses' and a 'Micro', in the orbit to take in passengers. Also, a last-minute risky plan of using the Micro to take off the last few people is put into action and it rescues the last group off the Moon just before impact.

The comet hits the Moon, shattering it. The resulting debris of loose rock creates a danger to the rescue ships, as well as to the people on Earth.

Some impactors, presumably a few hundred meters large, hit the Earth. The Western Hemisphere gets particularly affected because of the orientation of Earth during the impact. The coasts of the US are hit by multiple tsunamis and the land areas also face some impacts, resulting in widespread loss of life and property. The president, who had earlier decided against a coastal evacuation, is distraught. Many characters who have to deal with these events, like the residents of the affected areas, journalists and extremist militia members, are discussed in the novel.

One of the SSTOs gets destroyed in space by a piece of debris measuring several hundred meters. The Micro also gets damaged and Haskell is forced to perform an EVA to fix the issues, which eventually succeeds.

The US capital is also subsequently hit by a tsunami, and the president dies due to an aircraft malfunction during his rescue. Still in space, Haskell takes charge as the president. Haskell and other passengers of the Micro are subsequently rescued by the Percival Lowell, a 'nuclear-powered' ship (presumably nuclear thermal) originally meant for the first crewed mission to Mars.

A mile-long piece of the debris, dubbed 'Possum' (from 'Possible Impactor'), is discovered to be on course to hit the US mainland, kill almost everyone in the US and possibly cause long-term worldwide disaster. The option of using nuclear missiles is put on hold due to concerns of even worse effects through radioactive fallout. Instead, a plan to redirect the Possum into a safe course, using the SSTOs and Percival Lowell, is put into action.

An extremist militia group, with a lack of understanding of the impactor and sensing a possibility to take over the government, damages one of the SSTOs before getting subdued. Nevertheless, with the remaining spaceships, the redirection plan is determined to have retained the possibility of success.

The redirection mission gets underway, despite risks including inadequate knowledge of the impactor's geology. One SSTO eventually crashes midway through the mission due to a geological imperfection in the impactor. After the initial loss of hope, the mission is altered to a last-ditch attempt to coax the impactor, which happens to have a flat side, to skip off the atmosphere. The mission succeeds to delay the impact by several years.

The epilogue discusses the positive socio-political transformation due to the whole event, the steps taken to further deal with the Possum, a dedicated impact avoidance strategy, increased emphasis on the space program and the first anniversary of 'the birth of Space Age'.

== Influences ==
In the book's acknowledgements, McDevitt mentions Ben Bova's 1987 non-fiction book Welcome to Moonbase as the basis of the moonbase depicted in Moonfall.

== See also ==
- The Star (Wells short story)
- The Hammer of God (Clarke novel)
- Seveneves a novel
- Deep Impact (film)
- Impact (miniseries)
- Meteor (film)
- Armageddon (1998 film)
- When Worlds Collide (1951 film)
- ʻOumuamua, a confirmed interstellar object discovered in 2017
- Asteroid impact avoidance
- Boost-glide, a concept similar to the asteroid 'skipping' maneuver described in the novel
