= Tunguska event in fiction =

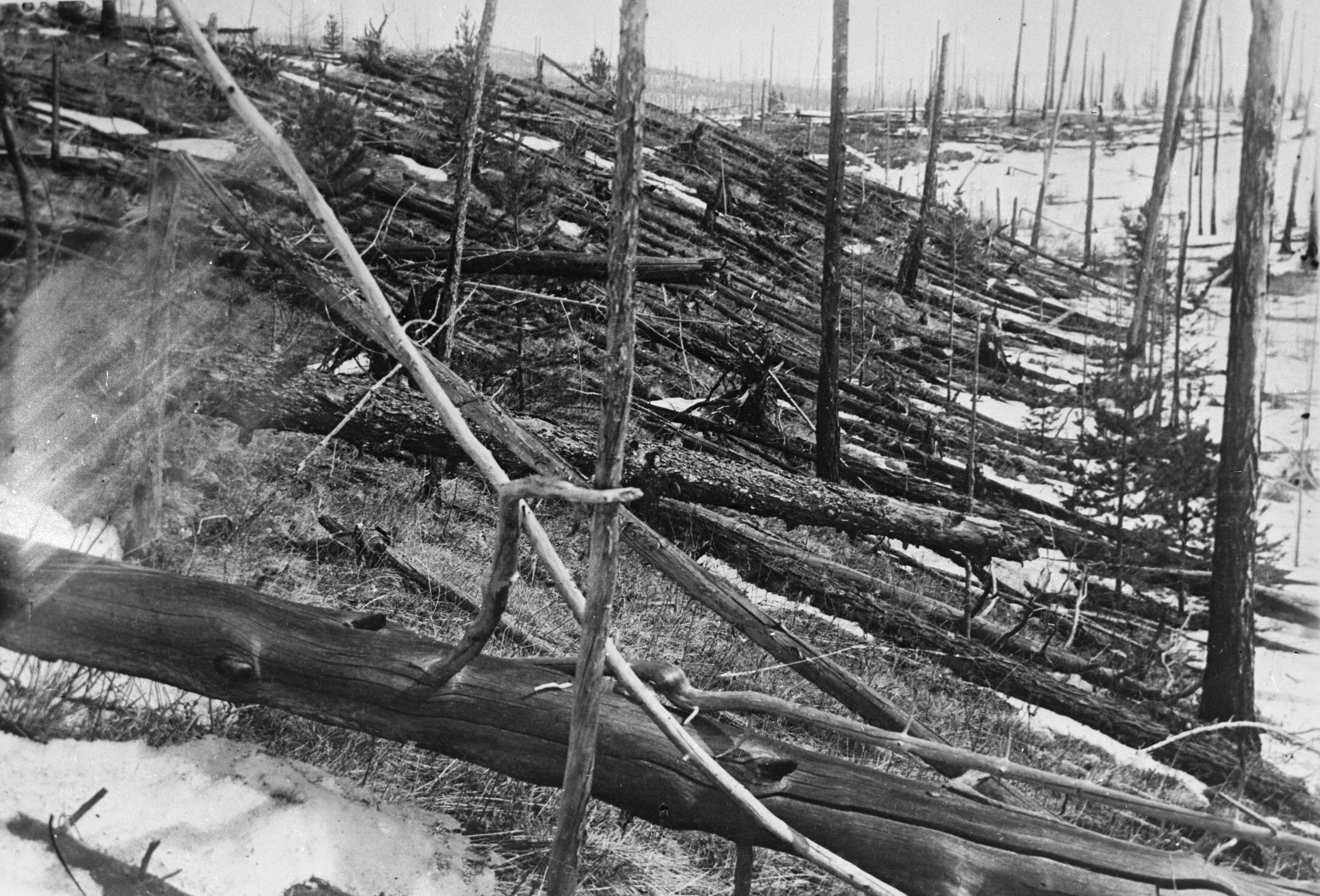
Trees felled by the 1908 Tunguska event

The Tunguska event—an enormous explosion in a remote region of Siberia on 30 June 1908 generally held to have been caused by a meteor air burst—has appeared in many works of fiction.

The event had a long-lasting influence on disaster stories featuring comets.

== Cause ==
While the event is generally held to have been caused by a meteor air burst, several alternative explanations have been proposed both in scientific circles and in fiction. A popular one in fiction is that it was caused by an alien spaceship, possibly first put forth in Ed Earl Repp's 1930 short story "The Second Missile". It gained prominence following the publication of Russian science fiction writer Alexander Kazantsev's 1946 short story "Explosion"; inspired by the similarities between the event and the nuclear bombing of Hiroshima, Kazantsev's story posits that a nuclear explosion in the engine of a spacecraft was responsible. An alien spacecraft is also the explanation in Polish science fiction writer Stanisław Lem's 1951 novel The Astronauts and its 1960 film adaptation The Silent Star, as well as in Arkady and Boris Strugatsky's 1965 novel Monday Begins on Saturday, while a human-made one is to blame in Ian Watson's 1983 novel Chekhov's Journey. Additional variations on the spaceship theme appear in Rudy Rucker and Bruce Sterling's 1985 short story "Storming the Cosmos" and Algis Budrys's 1993 novel Hard Landing, among others. Another proposed explanation is that the cause was the impact of a micro black hole, as in Larry Niven's 1975 short story "The Borderland of Sol" and Bill DeSmedt's 2004 novel Singularity.

== Effect ==
In Donald R. Bensen's 1978 novel And Having Writ..., the course of history is altered by the arrival of aliens on Earth in 1908, which also causes the Tunguska event. The 1996 The X-Files episode "Tunguska" revolves around the impact possibly having introduced alien microbial life to Earth. Ice from the impact turns out to have peculiar properties in Vladimir Sorokin's 2002 novel Ice and Jacek Dukaj's 2007 novel likewise titled Ice.

== See also ==
- Impact events in fiction
