= The Hammer of God (Clarke novel) =

1993 novel by Arthur C. Clarke

- First edition (UK)
- Author: Arthur C. Clarke
- Cover artist: Peter Mennim
- Language: English
- Genre: Science fiction
- Publisher: Victor Gollancz Ltd (UK); Bantam Spectra (US)
- Publication date: 1993
- Publication place: Great Britain
- Media type: Print (Hardback & Paperback)
- Pages: 226 pp
- ISBN: 0-553-09557-9
- OCLC: 27641704
- Dewey Decimal: 823/.914 20
- LC Class: PR6005.L36 H36 1993

The Hammer of God is a science fiction novel by Arthur C. Clarke originally published in 1993. Set in the year 2109, it deals with the discovery of an asteroid to be on course to collide with Earth and depicts the mission for deflecting the asteroid by using fusion thermal rockets.

== Setting ==
The main events of the novel start in the year 2109. Descriptions of various aspects of the future society and of the life of Robert Singh take up a significant part of the book.

A world government administers the Earth. The Moon and Mars also have established societies. New technologies include automated self-sufficient houses, genetically-engineered pets, 'Brainman' (VR with brain–computer interface), artificial general intelligence, medicine to double the human lifespan and extend fertility. The economics policy is guided by "the skilful application of Chaos Theory by World Bank mathematicians", having caused "the collapse of communism and capitalism – now so long ago that both events seemed simultaneous." The SPACEGUARD project exists with the goal of detecting and dealing with celestial bodies with the potential to strike the Earth, with Goliath and Hercules spaceships stationed near Jupiter L4 and L5 as interceptors.

Influenced by Islam during military campaigns in the Middle East, an American soldier had evolved into a religious figure and founded the new religion of Chrislam, with a more "liberated" philosophy compared to Islam and Christianity. The religion capitalized on Brainman technology to spread its teachings as "the first Religion of the Byte" and became a dominant religion.

In 2067, a nuclear bomb was exploded in space (on the other side of the Sun to avoid affecting the Earth) to generate powerful radio waves, whose echoes were used to identify more of possible impactors for the SPACEGUARD. In 2085, a transmission was received from Sirius, which, while indecipherable, resulted in growth of an extremist faction within Chrislam, 'The Reborn'.

The captain of Goliath is Robert Singh, a 70-year-old veteran of spaceflight. While studying for his engineering degree, he took part in the first marathon on the Moon and ended up being the only participant to finish. His ex-wife and their son reside on Earth, and he, his current wife, and their children reside on Mars. Aboard the Goliath, Singh and his team are extensively assisted by David, an AI.

In the initial sections of the book, three major meteor events are mentioned: the 1972 Great Daylight Fireball, the Tunguska event and the Cretaceous–Paleogene extinction event.

== Plot ==
A new contact binary asteroid is discovered by an amateur astronomer, Dr. Angus Millar, having been missed by the SPACEGUARD due to a combination of factors. It is named Kali and is determined to be on course to hit Earth in about a year's time. Goliath, having been at Jupiter L4, leaves for Deimos to receive the ATLAS propulsion module, which is designed for attaching with the asteroid and slowly deflecting it to a safe course by using nuclear fusion-powered thrusters. Then, having loaded hydrogen fuel at Europa, Goliath reaches Kali and starts the ATLAS.

Extremists from The Reborn, believing that the collision with Kali is meant to be, had planted bombs in the ATLAS that explode just moments after the activation of ATLAS. However, most of the fuel tanks of ATLAS remain functional, and the plan is changed to use Goliath itself to propel the asteroid. Meanwhile, a contingency plan is discussed by Earth's government to use nuclear weapons to break up the peanut shaped asteroid with enough energy that the fragments miss Earth.

Kali gets closer to Sun, starts ejecting material from vents, and is also adjudged to be a probable extinct comet. The resulting venting cancels off a bit of the deflection, taking it too close to the margin of error. Meanwhile, Earth's government affirms the usage of nuclear weapons, as the success of Goliath's mission is deemed too uncertain.

At Kali, Goliath suffers damage from the spacecraft sinking a few meters into the asteroid after weeks of pushing against it. As a result, Goliath loses its fuel and is stuck on the asteroid. With the nuclear weapon plan in effect, the members of the Goliath crew make peace with their upcoming deaths and indulge in pleasure-seeking.

The manufacture of nuclear weapons had been abandoned for many years, and the weapon intended for Kali is hurriedly put together. When it is fired towards the asteroid, the weapon proves defective and fails to explode, but it impacts with a high enough anomalous velocity that the asteroid breaks into two, with Goliath and its crew intact. The part carrying Goliath, Kali 1, stays on course to go safely past Earth, with the crew to be retrieved later by the help of another spaceship.

The other part, Kali 2, enters into the Earth's atmosphere and causes the deaths of a hundred thousand people and a trillion dollars' worth of damage. It reaches as close as sixty kilometers above surface before it skips off the Earth's atmosphere.

== Development and writing ==
In the 'Sources and Acknowledgements' section of the book, Clarke details the inspiration for the novel.

Clarke received a request for a short story for Time in May 1992. Having been abreast of NASA's Space-guard survey being conducted in the same year (which in turn borrowed its name from Spaceguard in Rendezvous with Rama), Clarke decided on asteroid impact avoidance as the theme for the short story, with the thought that "it was my duty to show what could be done about the asteroid menace. By creating a self-fulfilling prophecy I might even save the world - though I'd never know". The short story bearing the same title got published in Time magazine's "Beyond the Year 2000" issue in October 1992, being the second piece of fiction ever published by the magazine.

The Alvarez hypothesis for the K-Pg extinction event, which was then only 12 years old, is discussed by Clarke in the section. Clarke also mentions that the "final confirmation" of the hypothesis only came just before he published the novel.

Clarke's decision to "decompress" the short story into a novel was influenced by one of Dr. Duncan Steels' visual presentation about 'what might happen in the event of a major impact event'. The choice of time period for the novel (2109) was inspired by the contemporary view that Comet Swift-Tuttle had a high probability of impact with Earth in 2126.

== Literary significance and reception ==
The Library Journal review noted, "In the capable hands of science fiction veteran Clarke, a standard cosmic disaster plot becomes a lucid commentary on humanity's place in the cosmos".

== Film adaptation ==
The filmmaker Steven Spielberg optioned the rights to The Hammer of God for film production, but the resultant movie, Deep Impact (1998), was so dissimilar to the book that Clarke received no on-screen credit for the movie.

== References to other works ==
- Clarke reintroduces the idea of project Spaceguard, which he first mentioned in Rendezvous with Rama (1973) as a project to detect near-Earth objects. The Spaceguard featured in The Hammer of God (1993) would seem to be the Spaceguard that exists in the real world, which was inspired by and named after the one in Rendezvous with Rama, as it is remarked to have taken its name from an obscure science fiction novel, and the 9/11/2077 impact that prompted the Spaceguard of Rendezvous with Rama is only mentioned in the book's "Acknowledgements and Sources".
- Goliath's on-board supercomputer is named David and is very similar to HAL 9000 from 2001: A Space Odyssey.
- The planet-killing comet in Greenland was named in tribute to the author, Arthur C. Clarke.

== See also ==
- Impact events in fiction
- Armageddon, a 1998 disaster film similar to Deep Impact that was released a few months later
- Lucifer's Hammer – a novel by Larry Niven and Jerry Pournelle about a comet strike.

== Works cited ==
- Clarke, Arthur C. (2011) [First published 1993]. The Hammer of God. ASIN B005LB9HQG.
