= Simpel-Fonetik method of writing =

System of English-language spelling reform

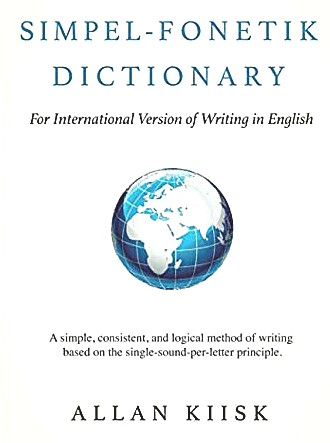
Book cover of the dictionary

Simpel-Fonetik is a system of English-language spelling reform that simplifies the reading, writing, and pronunciation of words in English. It was created by Allan Kiisk, a multilingual (English, German, Latin, and Estonian) professor of engineering.

Based on phonetic languages including Estonian, Finnish, and Hawaiian, it removes common difficulties of learning to communicate in English by correlating one unique letter per sound and one sound per letter.

== Description ==
=== Basic principles ===
Simpel-Fonetik writing is based on the following principles:

1. Each letter represents only one spoken sound
2. There is a letter for each basic sound in the English language
3. Double letters (two adjacent identical letters) represent long vowels and strong consonants.

=== Alphabet ===
The Simpel-Fonetik alphabet is based on the Latin script, with the addition of three letters with diacritics: ä, ö, and ü (with umlaut). The alphabet does not include the letters c, q, x, or y, which are only used when writing unassimilated foreign terms or proper names.

The 25-letter alphabet is:

Letter-glyph	Example usage	IPA
Vowels and semivowels
A	kap (cup)	ʌ
Ä	hät (hat)	æ
E	end	ɛ
I	fit	ɪ
J	jet (yet)	j
O	on	ɔ
Ö	pörtöörb (perturb)	ə
U	fut (foot), fuud (food)	ʊ, ʉː
Ü	übör (über)	y
W	win	w
Consonants
B	big	b
D	dog	d
F	left	f
G	golf	g
H	help	h
K	kelp	k
L	leg	l
M	lemön (lemon)	m
N	tenönt (tenant)	n
P	pet	p
R	risk	r
S	send	s
T	tent	t
V	vivid	v
Z	zuu (zoo)	z

=== Example ===
The Star (H. G. Wells)

Simpel-Fonetik

It was on the först dei of the nuu jiir thät the ännaunsment was meid, olmoust saimulteiniosli from thrii obsöörvatoris, thät the moushon of the plänet Neptune, thi autermoust of ool the plänets thät wiil öbaut the san, häd bikam veri erräätik. Ö retardeishon in its velossiti häd biin saspekted in Disember. Then ö feint, rimout spek of lait was diskaverd in the riidshon of the pörtöörbd plänet. Ät föörst this did not koos eni greit eksaitment. Saientifik piipl, hauever, faund the intelidshens rimaarkabl inaf iiven bifor it bikeim noun thät the nuu bodi was räpidli grouing laardsher änd braiter, änd thät its moushon was kwait different from the oorderli progres of the plänets.

Translation:
English

It was on the first day of the New Year that the announcement was made, almost simultaneously from three observatories, that the motion of the planet Neptune, the outermost of all the planets that wheel about the sun, had become very erratic. A retardation in its velocity had been suspected in December. Then a faint, remote speck of light was discovered in the region of the perturbed planet. At first this did not cause any great excitement. Scientific people, however, found the intelligence remarkable enough, even before it became known that the new body was rapidly growing larger and brighter, and that its motion was quite different from the orderly progress of the planets.

== See also ==
- English-language spelling reform
