= Disasters in popular culture =

Disasters in popular culture includes real and fictional disasters, as depicted by the media, and are considered social events. Disaster movies made in Hollywood are part of the American pop culture. Catastrophe types can include hostile aliens, climate change/global warming, environmental disasters, financial crises, natural disaster, nuclear apocalypse, pandemics, super heros, terrorist attacks, zombies and other technological meltdowns.

== Theories ==
There are different theories why audiences consume apocalyptic films, according to filmmaker Roland Emmerich, "They are somewhat cathartic. You see all this destruction and everything but at the end the right people save the day." Wheeler Winston Dixon notes, "I think they’re sort of preparing us for something that’s going to happen in the future."

According to Eva Horn, "What makes today’s obsession different from previous epochs’ is the sense of a “catastrophe without event,” a stealthily creeping process of disintegration. Ultimately, Horn argues, imagined catastrophes offer us intellectual tools that can render a future shadowed with apocalyptic possibilities affectively, epistemologically, and politically accessible."

== See also ==
- Apocalyptic and post-apocalyptic fiction
- AI takeovers in popular culture
- Disaster books
- Doomsday devices in popular culture
- Global catastrophic risk
- Global warming in popular culture
- Impact events in fiction
- Tunguska event in fiction
- Tropical cyclones in popular culture
