= Gerta Keller =

Geologist and paleontologist

- Keller in 2025
- Born: March 7, 1945 (age 81); Schaan, Liechtenstein
- Citizenship: Switzerland; Liechtenstein; United States
- Education: City College of San Francisco (attended); San Francisco State University (BS); Stanford University (MS, PhD)
- Scientific career
- Fields: Paleontology

Gerta Keller (born 7 March 1945) is a geologist and paleontologist whose work has focused on global catastrophes and mass extinctions. She has been a professor of geosciences at Princeton University since 1984 and received emeritus status in July 2020.

Keller contests the mainstream Alvarez hypothesis that the impact of the Chicxulub impactor, or another large celestial body, directly caused the Cretaceous–Paleogene extinction event. Keller maintains that such an impact predates the mass extinction and that Deccan volcanism and its environmental consequences were the most likely major cause, but possibly exacerbated by the impact. Considered a leading authority on catastrophes and mass extinctions, including the biotic and environmental effects of impacts and volcanism, Keller is one of few scientists whose work has consistently supported the contention, with nearly half of her 300 publications being articles which address the asteroid impact/volcano controversy.

== Early life and education ==
Keller was raised in Switzerland on a dairy farm, the sixth of 12 children. She grew up in poverty. In the one-room schoolhouse where she was educated, boys were given training in math and science while girls were taught cooking and cleaning, the skills they would need to be proper housewives. Her hunger for knowledge led her to read the textbooks assigned to her elder siblings, and she would prepare summaries of the material for her brothers and sisters.

She attended a vocational school starting at age 14 and learned sewing. There she organized a protest against rules that required female students to wear skirts, as she rode her bicycle three miles each way to school and wanted to be able to protect herself from the cold. The female students won the right to wear pants from then on.

After receiving her vocational certificate at age 17, she went to work for Pierre Cardin, where she was paid the equivalent of 25 cents per hour to sew luxury gowns that would sell for as much as $1,000 for which she was paid $12. In 1964, at age nineteen, she quit her job in Zurich and began traveling around the world. She learned English and working in England, followed by travel to North Africa, Spain and Australia. She survived being shot in a bank robbery in Australia in 1965, despite awakening in a hospital intensive care unit to find a priest pressing her to confess, telling her that she was going to die.

After ending up in San Francisco in 1968, Keller was "freaked out" by the shots and tear gas launched at student protests; she chose to focus on education and took a high school equivalency exam. In her undergraduate years, Keller initially studied anthropology, but feeling as it didn't fit her goal to travel, she decided to instead study geology and eventually paleontology. She studied at City College of San Francisco and received her undergraduate degree from San Francisco State University and her doctorate in geology and paleontology from Stanford University in 1978.

== Career ==
After earning her doctorate in Earth Sciences in 1978, Keller worked for the United States Geological Survey and Stanford. She came to Princeton University in 1984 and after a few years started studying the Cretaceous–Paleogene boundary (K–T boundary), the geological signature of the Cretaceous–Paleogene extinction event. Keller's research has led her to conclude that the Chicxulub asteroid impact, the leading hypothesized cause for the Cretaceous–Paleogene extinction event, predates the event to the degree that it could not have been the sole cause. "I'm sure the day after, they had a headache," Keller states, further stating that "we vastly overestimate the damage to the environment and to life that this Chicxulub impact had".

The main evidence for the Alvarez hypothesis that the Chicxulub impact resulted in the Cretaceous–Paleogene extinction event, supported by earth sciences consensus, comes from the presence around the world of shocked quartz granules, glass spherules and tektites embedded in a layer of clay with extremely high levels of iridium, all signs of an asteroid impact. Keller's research found layers where the glass spherules and the iridium clay are separated by as much as 8 feet (2.4 m) of sandstone and other material. Supporters of the Alvarez hypothesis have concluded that the sandstone is the result of a massive tsunami caused by the Chicxulub impact that sandwiched the sand between the shocked quartz layer and the iridium clay. Keller's analysis of the strata between the spherules and iridium clay concludes that the material was laid down over as much as 300,000 years based on signs of plankton, worms and weathering found on the intervening material.

Bestowed the title of Doctor Honoris by The University of Lausanne, Switzerland (2022) for her major contributions to the mass extinction controversy of the Cretaceous-Tertiary period, Keller has received countless recognitions in her field of scientific work. This includes the 2012 Radhakrishna Prize for research on Deccan volcanism linked to the end-Cretaceous mass extinction, among various other distinguished fellowships, honors and awards.

== Selected publications ==
- Gerta Keller; Madan L. Nagori; Maya Chaudhary; A. Nallapa Reddy; B.C. Jaiprakash; Jorge E. Spangenberg; Paula Mateo; Thierry Adatte (2021). "Cenomanian-Turonian sea-level transgression and OAE2 deposition in the Western Narmada Basin, India" (PDF). Gondwana Research. 94 (June, 2021): 73–86. Bibcode:2021GondR..94...73K. doi:10.1016/j.gr.2021.02.013. S2CID 233809429. Archived from the original (PDF) on 2021-05-13.
- Gerta Keller; Paula Mateo; Johannes Monkenbusch; Nicolas Thibault; Jahnavi Punekar; Jorge E. Spangenberg; Sigal Abramovich; Sarit Ashckenazi-Polivoda; Blair Schoene; Michael P. Eddy; Kyle M. Samperton; Syed F.R. Khadri; Thierry Adatte (2020). "Mercury linked to Deccan Traps volcanism, climate change and the end-Cretaceous mass extinction". Global and Planetary Change. 194 (November, 2020) 103312. Bibcode:2020GPC...19403312K. doi:10.1016/j.gloplacha.2020.103312.
- Blair Schoene; Kyle M. Samperton; Michael P. Eddy; Gerta Keller; Thierry Adatte; Samuel A. Bowring; Syed F. R. Khadri; Brian Gertsch (2014). "U-Pb geochronology of the Deccan Traps and relation to the end-Cretaceous mass extinction". Science. 347 (6218): 182–4. Bibcode:2015Sci...347..182S. doi:10.1126/science.aaa0118. PMID 25502315. S2CID 206632431.
- Keller G, Abramovich S, Berner Z, Adatte T (1 January 2009). "Biotic effects of the Chicxulub impact, K–T catastrophe and sea level change in Texas". Palaeogeography, Palaeoclimatology, Palaeoecology. 271 (1–2): 52–68. Bibcode:2009PPP...271...52K. doi:10.1016/j.palaeo.2008.09.007.
- Gerta Keller; Thierry Adatte; Alfonso Pardo Juez; Jose G. Lopez-Oliva (2009). "New evidence concerning the age and biotic effects of the Chicxulub impact in NE Mexico". Journal of the Geological Society. 166 (3): 393–411. Bibcode:2009JGSoc.166..393K. doi:10.1144/0016-76492008-116. S2CID 128971301.
- Gerta Keller; T. Adatte; S. Gardin; A. Bartolini; S. Bajpai (30 April 2008). "Main Deccan volcanism phase ends near the K–T boundary: Evidence from the Krishna–Godavari Basin, SE India". Earth and Planetary Science Letters. 268 (3–4): 293–311. Bibcode:2008E&PSL.268..293K. doi:10.1016/j.epsl.2008.01.015.
- Gerta Keller; Thierry Adatte; Zsolt Berner; Markus Harting; Gerald Baum; Michael Prauss; Abdel Tantawy; Doris Stueben (30 March 2007). "Chicxulub impact predates K–T boundary: New evidence from Brazos, Texas". Earth and Planetary Science Letters. 255 (3–4): 339–356. Bibcode:2007E&PSL.255..339K. doi:10.1016/j.epsl.2006.12.026.
- Gerta Keller (2007). "Impact stratigraphy: Old principle, new reality". Special Paper 437: The Sedimentary Record of Meteorite Impacts. Vol. 437. pp. 147–178. doi:10.1130/2008.2437(09). ISBN 978-0-8137-2437-9.
- Keller G, Adatte T, Stinnesbeck W, Rebolledo-Vieyra, Fucugauchi JU, Kramar U, Stueben D (2004). "Chicxulub impact predates the K-T boundary mass extinction". PNAS. 101 (11): 3753–3758. Bibcode:2004PNAS..101.3753K. doi:10.1073/pnas.0400396101. PMC 374316. PMID 15004276.
- Gerta Keller; W. Stinnesbeck; T. Adatte; D. Stueben (September 2003). "Multiple impacts across the Cretaceous–Tertiary boundary". Earth-Science Reviews. 62 (3–4): 327–363. Bibcode:2003ESRv...62..327K. doi:10.1016/S0012-8252(02)00162-9.
- Keller, Gerta; MacLeod, N., eds. (1996). Cretaceous-Tertiary Mass Extinctions: Biotic and Environmental Changes. W. W. Norton & Co. ISBN 978-0-393-96657-2.
- Ward W. C.; Keller G.; Stinnesbeck W.; Adatte T. (October 1995). "Yucatán subsurface stratigraphy: Implications and constraints for the Chicxulub impact". Geology. 23 (10): 873–876. Bibcode:1995Geo....23..873W. doi:10.1130/0091-7613(1995)023<0873:YNSSIA>2.3.CO;2.
