= 1913 Easter tornado outbreak =

Severe windstorm in the United States

Coordinates: 41.25°N 96°W

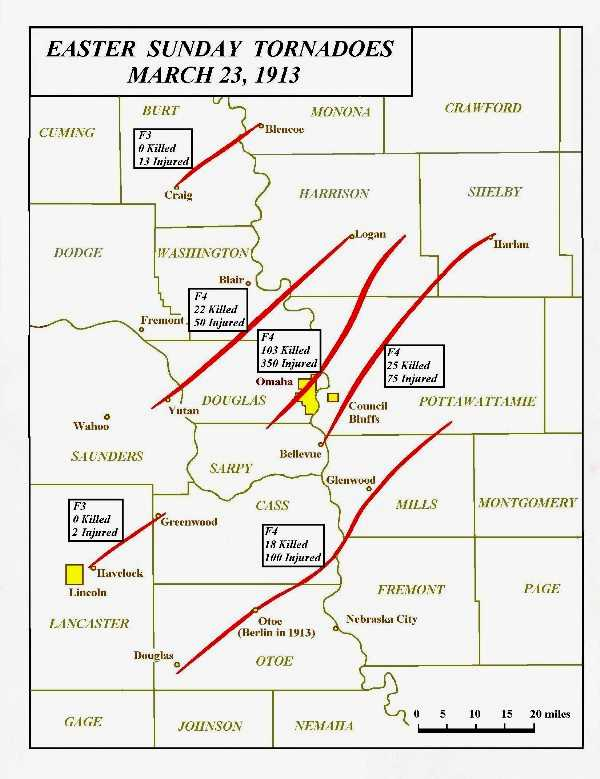
- A map showing the tracks of the tornadoes

Tornado outbreak
- Tornadoes: ≥ 15
- Max. rating: F4+ tornado
- Duration: March 23, 1913

Overall effects
- Fatalities: 192
- Injuries: 853+
- Damage: $3 million ($97,730,000 in 2025 USD) (Note: All losses are in 1913 United States dollars unless otherwise noted.)
- Areas affected: Central United States
- Part of the tornadoes and tornado outbreaks of 1913

On March 23, 1913—Easter Sunday—a devastating tornado outbreak affected the northern Great Plains and sections of the Upper Midwest, lasting approximately 3 1/2 hours. (Note: An outbreak is generally defined as a group of at least six tornadoes (the number sometimes varies slightly according to local climatology) with no more than a six-hour gap between individual tornadoes. An outbreak sequence, prior to (after) the start of modern records in 1950, is defined as a period of no more than two (one) consecutive days without at least one significant (F2 or stronger) tornado.) It was the most violent tornado outbreak to affect the northern Great Plains on so early a date in the year—a record that still stands as of 2020. That day, four F4 tornadoes affected portions of eastern Nebraska and western Iowa, killing at least 168 people. The deadliest tornado of the day was a violent tornado, retroactively rated F4 on the present-day Fujita scale, (Note: The Fujita scale was devised under the aegis of scientist T. Theodore Fujita in the early 1970s. Prior to the advent of the scale in 1971, tornadoes in the United States were officially unrated. Tornado ratings were retroactively applied to events prior to the formal adoption of the F-scale by the National Weather Service. While the Fujita scale has been superseded by the Enhanced Fujita scale in the U.S. since February 1, 2007, Canada used the old scale until April 1, 2013; nations elsewhere, like the United Kingdom, apply other classifications such as the TORRO scale.) that grew to 1/4 mile (440 yd) in width as it passed through northern Omaha, Nebraska, killing at least 94 people in the city proper and three in rural areas. Damage in Omaha reached at least F4, possibly even F5, intensity, though confirmation of F5 damage could not be determined from available evidence. The tornado is the 13th deadliest ever to affect the United States and the deadliest to hit the U.S. state of Nebraska as of 2024. No other violent tornado would affect Omaha for another 62 years. Outside the Great Plains, the outbreak of March 23 also produced two other F4 tornadoes, one each in Missouri and Indiana, including a devastating path more than 1/2 mi (880 yd) through southern Terre Haute, Indiana, killing 21 people and injuring 250. In all, tornadoes struck Nebraska, Iowa, Louisiana, Indiana, and Missouri, though only significant events were recorded and other, weaker tornadoes may have gone undetected.

== Background ==
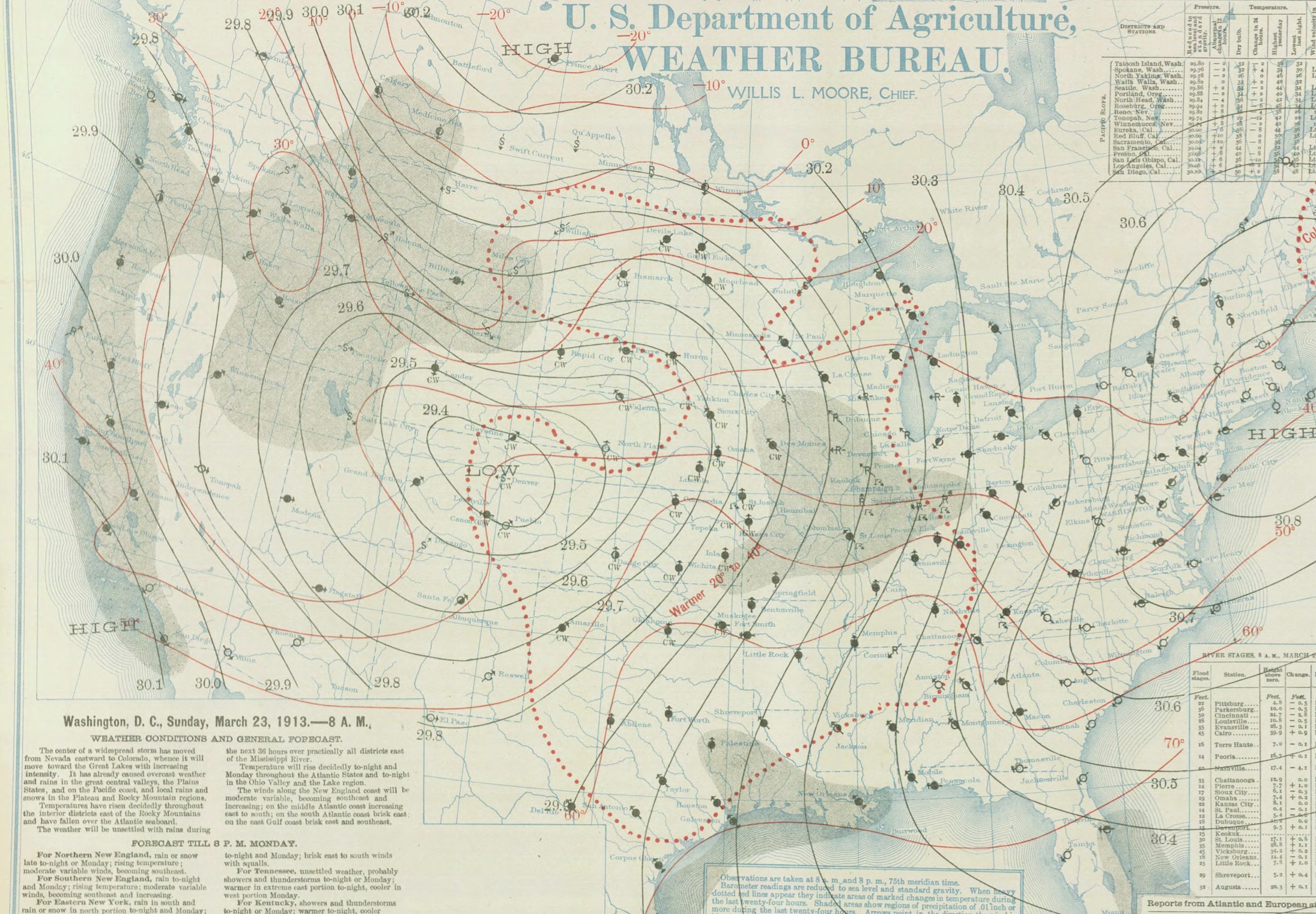
Weather analysis on March 23

A series of potent storm systems traversed the US during March 1913, described by the US Weather Bureau as "...the most extraordinary situation in regards to the weather since the creation of the bureau." Anomalously high moisture had gathered near the US Gulf Coast, as an intense upper level storm system moved in from the west. According to retrospective numerical modeling of this event, a strong cap aloft was in place over the central Plains, as is common as the elevated mixed layer advects eastward from the Rockies. Observations taken at 13Z 23 March 1913 showed that surface low pressure was located in Colorado, and a warm front stretched due eastward from there into Illinois. Morning temperatures near this front were in the 30s. South of the front warmer and moister air was present, but dewpoints in the upper 50s were confined to southern Oklahoma and Arkansas, far away from where the tornadoes were to later occur in eastern Nebraska and western Iowa.

As the day progressed, the surface low ejected through Nebraska, with a dry line and trailing cold front. South winds blowing 40–50 knots at times brought the moister air rapidly northward. One of the worst dust storms on record occurred behind the dry line in western Kansas, but in the warm sector the day remained dry until mid afternoon when light showers began to form in central Nebraska. A cooperative observer in Osceola noted that the wind shifted from S to NW at 2230Z (4:30 PM local). Professors at the University of Nebraska at Lincoln noted that the relative humidity there jumped from 53% at 2150Z to 78% at 2230Z, indicating much higher dewpoints had rapidly arrived in Lincoln since the cold front was still to the west near Osceola. They also noted that the surface low passed just to the north of Omaha and was in western Iowa at 01Z 24 March 1913.

With all of this observed information, it is likely that the quality moisture required to produce convection strong enough for tornadoes arrived just an hour or two before the strong forcing associated with the surface low pressure and attendant frontal systems. At the time of the tornadoes it is estimated that surface temperatures were in the upper 60s, dewpoints were in the upper 50s, and surface winds were southerly around 25–30 knots. Numerical modeling estimates that 500 hPa flow was around 80 knots from the WSW and that CAPE was from 1000 to 2000 J/kg. These conditions are similar to those found in other tornado outbreaks. Tornadic storms developed from 5:00-6:00 PM local time and while storm motions were to the NE, the prevalence of tornadic storms moved southward with the dryline/cold front intersection, lasting until 8:00 PM local in NW Missouri. A serial derecho then formed and moved across Iowa and Illinois through the nighttime hours, hitting Chicago in the early morning.

== Outbreak statistics ==
Outbreak death toll
State	Total
Indiana	21
Iowa	33
Louisiana	1
Missouri	2
Nebraska	135
Totals	192
All deaths were tornado-related

== Confirmed tornadoes ==
Confirmed tornadoes by Fujita rating
FU	F0	F1	F2	F3	F4	F5	Total
?	1	?	5	3	6	0	≥ 15

Prior to 1990, there is a likely undercount of tornadoes, particularly E/F0–1, with reports of weaker tornadoes becoming more common as population increased. A sharp increase in the annual average E/F0–1 count by approximately 200 tornadoes was noted upon the implementation of NEXRAD Doppler weather radar in 1990–1991. (Note: Historically, the number of tornadoes globally and in the United States was and is likely underrepresented: research by Grazulis on annual tornado activity suggests that, as of 2001, only 53% of yearly U.S. tornadoes were officially recorded. Documentation of tornadoes outside the United States was historically less exhaustive, owing to the lack of monitors in many nations and, in some cases, to internal political controls on public information. Most countries only recorded tornadoes that produced severe damage or loss of life. Significant low biases in U.S. tornado counts likely occurred through the early 1990s, when advanced NEXRAD was first installed and the National Weather Service began comprehensively verifying tornado occurrences.) 1974 marked the first year where significant tornado (E/F2+) counts became homogenous with contemporary values, attributed to the consistent implementation of Fujita scale assessments. Numerous discrepancies on the details of tornadoes in this outbreak exist between sources. The total count of tornadoes and ratings differs from various agencies accordingly. The list below documents information from the most contemporary official sources alongside assessments from tornado historian Thomas P. Grazulis.

=== March 23 event ===
Confirmed tornadoes – Sunday, March 23, 1913 (Note: All dates are based on the local time zone where the tornado touched down; however, all times are in Coordinated Universal Time and dates are split at midnight CST/CDT for consistency.)
F#	Location	County / Parish	State	Time (UTC)	Path length	Width (Note: The listed width values are primarily the average/mean width of the tornadoes, with those having known maximum widths denoted by ♯. From 1952 to 1994, reports largely list mean width whereas contemporary years list maximum width. Values provided by Grazulis are the average width, with estimates being rounded down (i.e. 0.5 mi (0.80 km) is rounded down from 880 yards to 800 yards.)	Damage
F3	W of Craig (NE) to NW of Blencoe (IA)	Burt (NE), Monona (IA)	NE, IA	23:00–?	15 mi (24 km)	200 yd (180 m)	Unknown
F3	This intense tornado hit rural areas, collectively affecting 15 or more farms. Striking the northwestern side of Craig, it also destroyed 11 homes. 13 people were injured.						
F4	SE of Mead (NE) to northern Yutan (NE) to Woodbine (IA)	Saunders (NE), Douglas (NE), Washington (NE), Harrison (IA)	NE, IA	23:30–?	62–63 mi (100–101 km)	800 yd (730 m)	$100,000
F4	22 deaths – This violent tornado leveled the northern side of Yutan, claiming 17 lives there, half of them children's. In town the tornado destroyed or damaged 40 homes, along with a quartet of churches. It also killed a few people in Iowa before dissipating, as well as three more near Yutan. In all 50 injuries were reported. The tornado passed just west of Logan, Iowa.						
F3	Lincoln to Prairie Home to E of Greenwood	Lancaster, Cass	NE	23:30–?	15 mi (24 km)	150 yd (140 m)	Unknown
F3	Touching down near Havelock, Lincoln, this event was part of the Omaha tornado family. It destroyed several homes and injured a few people.						
F4	Ralston (NE) to northwestern Omaha (NE) to S of Arcadia (IA)	Sarpy (NE), Douglas (NE), Pottawattamie (IA), Harrison (IA), Shelby (IA), Carroll (IA)	NE, IA	23:45–?	85–90 mi (137–145 km)	400 yd (370 m)	$2,500,000
F4	103 deaths – See section on this tornado – 350 people were injured.						
F4	Southern Bellevue (NE) to southern Council Bluffs (IA) to SE of Glidden (IA)	Sarpy (NE), Pottawattamie (IA), Harrison (IA), Shelby (IA), Audubon (IA), Carroll (IA)	NE, IA	00:15–?	~98 mi (158 km)	400 yd (370 m)	$400,000
F4	25 deaths – Part of a two-member family, this tornado leveled small, possibly frail homes in Iowa. A secondary tornado may have caused 15 mi (24 km) or more of damage. 75 injuries occurred. The tornado passed east of Harlan, Iowa, near Gray, and near Carroll.						
F4	S of Douglas (NE) to Berlin (NE) to E of Macedonia (IA)	Otoe (NE), Cass (NE), Mills (IA), Pottawattamie (IA)	NE, IA	00:15–?	65–75 mi (105–121 km)	800 yd (730 m)	Unknown
F4	18 deaths – This potent tornado flattened numerous farms in Nebraska, causing a dozen deaths in Berlin, now Otoe. Hitting Rock Bluff—then Rock Cliffs—it claimed still another life, then leveled more farms in Iowa. In all 100 injuries were reported.						
F2	NW of Saline	Bienville	LA	01:00–?	6 mi (9.7 km)	200 yd (180 m)	Unknown
F2	1+ death – This tornado destroyed small tenant homes, as well as a spacious home. It or a related event may have killed one more person in Bossier Parish. Five people were injured.						
F2	Burchard	Pawnee	NE	01:00–?	≥5 mi (8.0 km)	Unknown	Unknown
F2	This tornado unroofed and destroyed four homes, along with a school. This or a separate-but-related tornado may have destroyed a few barns in nearby Barneston.						
F2+	Falls City	Richardson	NE	~01:00–?	Unknown	Unknown	Unknown
F2+	A tornado felled utility poles and trees, while leveling a large warehouse.						
F3+	Mount Ayr	Ringgold	IA	~02:00–?	Unknown	Unknown	Unknown
F3+	Apparently intense, this tornado felled large trees and chimneys, while blowing a church 8 in (0.67 ft; 0.20 m) off its foundation.						
F4	N of Prairieton to southern Terre Haute to near Brazil	Vigo, Clay	IN	02:30–?	22 mi (35 km)	1,000 yd (910 m)	Unknown
F4	21 deaths – This tornado virtually leveled a five-block swath of Terre Haute, destroying or damaging 300 homes in town. Damaging floods followed the tornado, adding to losses. 250 people were injured.						
F4	SW of Savannah to E of Albany	Andrew, Gentry, Harrison	MO	02:30–?	45 mi (72 km)	200 yd (180 m)	Unknown
F4	2 deaths – This tornado destroyed buildings on 30 farms in Gentry County. It also swept away at least one home and leveled many farms, while destroying other homes. Eight injuries occurred.						
F2+	Southern Fremont	Dodge	NE	Unknown	Unknown	Unknown	Unknown
F2+	A tornado tossed a 150-foot-tall (46 m) smokestack 30 ft (9.1 m).						
F0	Guthrie Center	Guthrie	IA	Unknown	Unknown	Unknown	Unknown
F0	This tornado hit a farm, damaging several outbuildings.						
F2+	S of Casey to between Stuart and Menlo	Adair, Guthrie	IA	Unknown	Unknown	Unknown	Unknown
F2+	A tornado destroyed homes and barns, while felling trees and power poles.						

=== Omaha, Nebraska–Beebeetown, Iowa ===
Omaha, Nebraska–Beebeetown, Iowa
- The Omaha tornado

Meteorological history
- Formed: March 23, 1913, 6:45 p.m. CDT (UTC−05:00)

F4+ tornado
- on the Fujita scale

Overall effects
- Fatalities: 103 (94 in Omaha)
- Injuries: 350+
- Damage: $8,000,000 ($260,610,000 in 2025 USD)

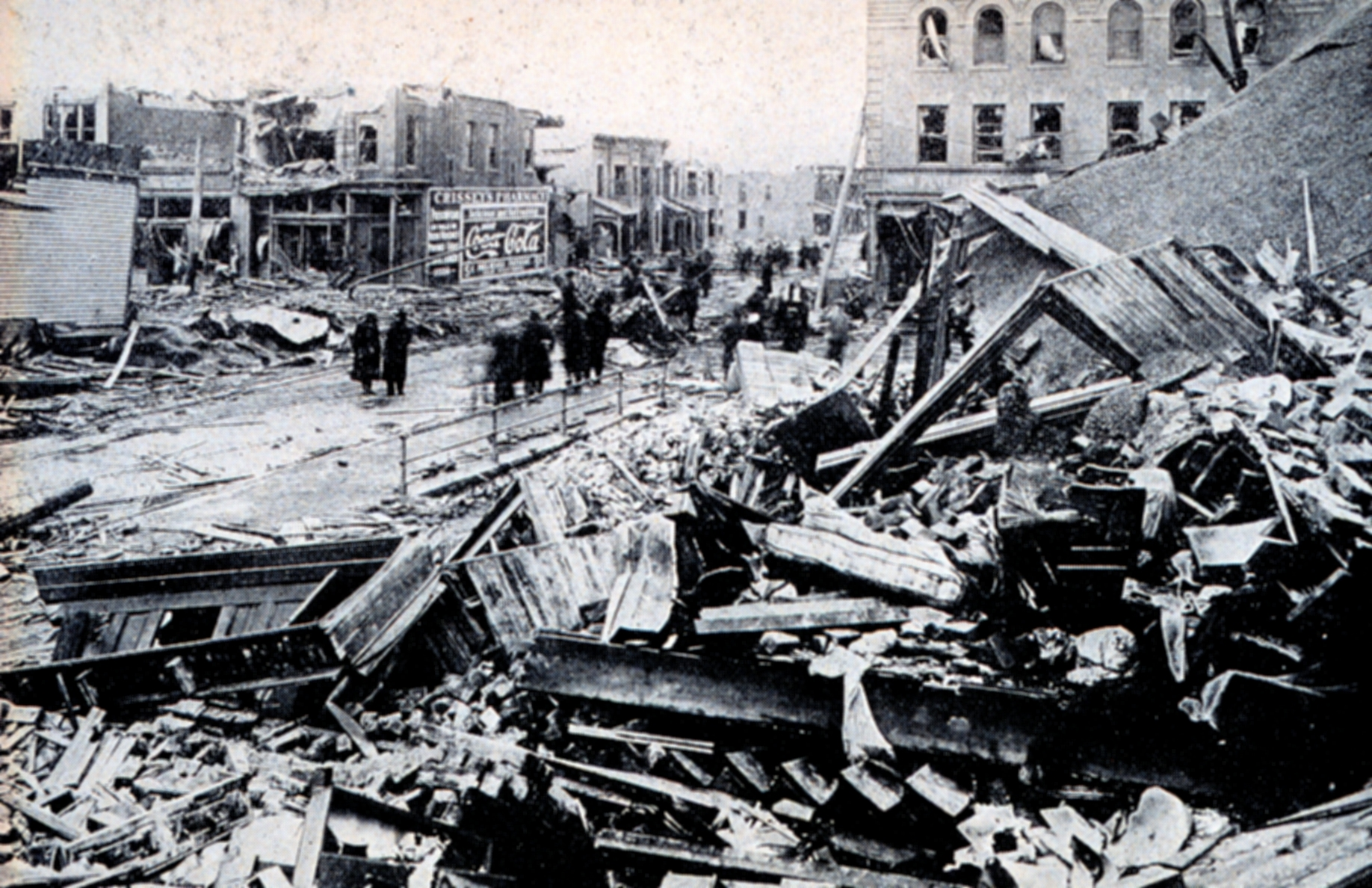
Damage in Omaha

This violent and extremely deadly tornado, the deadliest of the outbreak, would strike Omaha, Nebraska at approximately 6:00 p.m. local standard time on March 23, 1913. The storm's path was reported as being 1/4–1/2 mi (0.40–0.80 km) wide and contained multiple vortices.

The Omaha tornado followed the path of Little Papillion Creek as it entered the city. It moved through the west side of town alongside the Missouri Pacific Railroad, destroying the small workers cottages in the area. The tornado was so strong that steel train cars were later found pierced by pieces of shattered lumber from the demolished homes.

By the time the tornado reached Dewey Avenue it was five blocks wide. When it reached Farnam Hill, the tornado followed a shallow valley through this upscale neighborhood. The large mansions of Farnam were no match for the winds, and many houses were torn to pieces, along with several in the Gold Coast Historic District including the Joslyn Castle, which sustained considerable damage. Buildings were found chopped in half, pipes and supports dangling into space, such as the Duchesne Academy which was nearly obliterated.

At North 24th and Lake Streets in the Near North Side neighborhood a large African American crowd was enjoying an Easter Sunday performance when the tornado flattened the building and killed more than two dozen people. Other brick structures in this small commercial district took similar hits, and more people died here than in any other part of Omaha. A streetcar running down North 24th Street in North Omaha encountered the tornado near this area. Thanks to the quick action of operator Ord Hensley in ordering passengers to lie on the floor of the car, everyone survived. Later, photographers would spot the wrecked machine and would call it the "Streetcar of Death", imagining that no one on board could have survived given the immense damage.

The F4 tornado skirted the downtown area and moved over the Missouri River into Iowa, killing a few children near Beebeetown and causing further damage. Passing north of Persia, the tornado tracked through or near Defiance, Panama, and Manilla. South of Arcadia it hurled a farmhouse 50 ft (15 m), shortly before dissipating. Tornado expert Thomas P. Grazulis variously estimated a total path length of 40 to 45 mi (64 to 72 km), but subsequent analysis by other researchers in 2007 indicated a path more than twice as long.

In all, 103 people died, 94 of which were in Omaha, and at least 350 were injured. Reportedly, 1,700 homes in Omaha alone were destroyed or damaged, with $8 million total damage from the storm, $5 1/2 million of which was in Omaha (financial damage estimates vary; the NOAA reports more damage than this). In the aftermath of the tornado, a cold front moved into Omaha and caused further misery, as newly homeless residents struggled to escape the snowy weather. Many homes, mostly small, throughout the northern side of the city were leveled, and "dozens" were swept away. Photographs at the time showed empty foundations, suggestive of F5 damage, but these may have been related to post-tornado clean-up.

== Non-tornadic effects ==
The same storm system that struck Nebraska created a dust storm in Kansas and hit Missouri with hail and heavy rain. The Omaha tornado marked the beginning of the destruction from storms associated with the Great Flood of 1913. On Monday and Tuesday, March 24 and 25, the storms brought heavy rains to the Midwest and upstate New York, causing widespread flooding.

== Aftermath ==
Remarkably, operators from the Webster Telephone Exchange Building in Omaha did not leave their stations either during or after the tornado. The building was used as an infirmary for the wounded and dying, with physicians and nurses coming from area hospitals. US Army troops from Fort Omaha set up headquarters in the building, as soldiers patrolled the area for looters and to offer assistance.

Initially, James Dahlman, the longtime mayor of Omaha, refused assistance from any outside sources, including the federal government. However, he relented after seeing the extent of the damage throughout the city. The federal government poured in assistance soon after. The massive damage caused by the tornado inspired new engineering techniques aimed at creating a tornado-proof edifice. The first such building was the First National Bank of Omaha building, built in 1916 at 1603 Farnam Street. The 14-story building was built in a "U"-shape.

== See also ==
- 2020 Easter tornado outbreak – Another deadly tornado outbreak during Easter weekend 107 years later.
- Disaster Books – Omaha Easter Sunday Tornado
- Great Dayton Flood
- List of North American tornadoes and tornado outbreaks
- List of tornadoes causing 100 or more deaths
- List of tornadoes striking downtown areas
- Timeline of North Omaha, Nebraska history
- Tornado outbreak of April 25–28, 2024 - Another significant, similar tornado outbreak that struck the Omaha area on April 26
