= Jan Smit (paleontologist) =

Dutch paleontologist (born 1948)

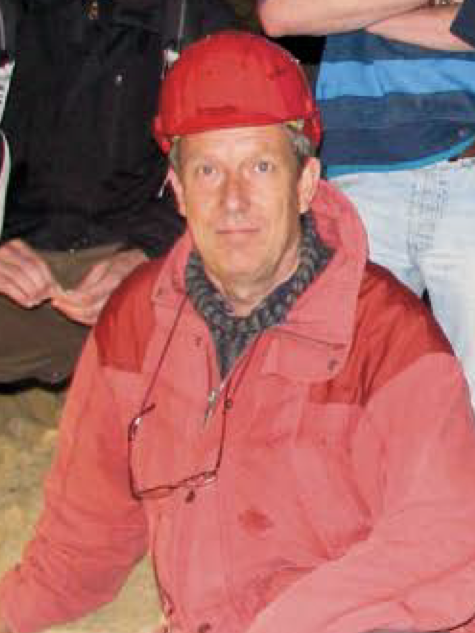
- Smit in 2018
- Born: 8 April 1948 (age 78); The Hague, Netherlands
- Education: University of Amsterdam
- Occupation: Paleontologist
- Known for: Alvarez hypothesis
- Awards: Barringer Medal (2012); Van Waterschoot van der Gracht Medal (2016)
- Scientific career
- Fields: Event stratigraphy
- Workplaces: Vrije Universiteit Amsterdam
- Thesis: A Catastrophic Event at the Cretaceous–Tertiary Boundary (1981)

Jan Smit (born 8 April 1948) is a Dutch paleontologist. He was affiliated with the Faculty of Earth and Life Sciences at the Vrije Universiteit Amsterdam from 2003 to 2013 as a professor of event stratigraphy, studying rapid changes in the geological record related to mass extinctions.

Smit independently hypothesized and worked on the asteroid impact hypothesis linking it to the Cretaceous–Paleogene extinction event, which, according to Smit and others, wiped out the non-avian dinosaurs.

== Career ==
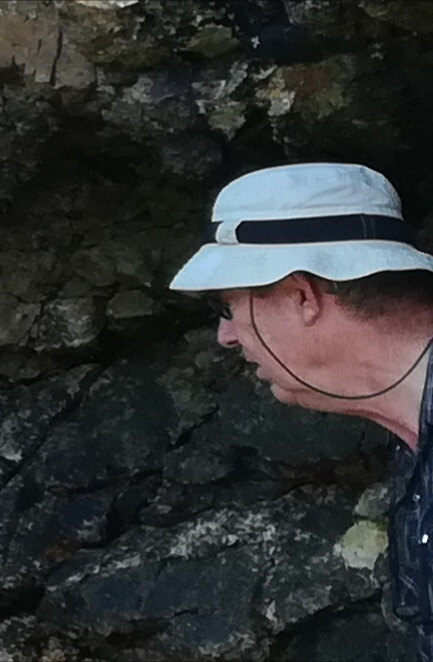
Smit looking at rocks, 2017

Jan Smit was born on 8 April 1948 in the Hague. Smit graduated from the University of Amsterdam in 1974 with a master's degree in geology. In 1981 he obtained his PhD (cum laude) at the same university.

Smit's main area of research is on the Cretaceous–Paleogene extinction event, which, he proposes, ended the Cretaceous period and killed all non-avian dinosaurs. He was an early researcher into the now-challenged belief that an asteroid impact was responsible for their extinction; his dissertation, titled "A Catastrophic Event at the Cretaceous–Tertiary Boundary", was related to Luis and Walter Alvarez's recently published theory on the extinction event. The explanation is known as the Alvarez hypothesis, but was proposed independently by Smit, despite his later publication.

Luis Alvarez described Smit as "a KT [Cretaceous–Tertiary] expert [who] has studied more KT sites around the world than anyone else". In 2019 The New Yorker labelled Smit as a "world authority" on the impact and extinction event.

== Other hypothesis ==
Other analysis on the asteroid impact hypothesis has suggested that the Cretaceous–Paleogene extinction event might have been ongoing for some time before and after the asteroid impact event.

Research by Dr. Gerta Keller at Princeton and a data analyses approach by A. Cox and C. Brenhin Keller in their paper provide a broader picture of the events that might have caused the Cretaceous–Paleogene extinction event.

This new research does not dismiss the asteroid impact hypothesis but provides a broader context in which to view the Cretaceous–Paleogene extinction event.

== Personal life ==
Smit's daughter is Renske Smit, a researcher at the Astrophysics Research Institute at Liverpool John Moores University in Liverpool, England. She is one of only a handful of UK-based astronomers in the core survey teams of the James Webb Space Telescope. Smit's son-in-law is Robert Crain, a professor of theoretical astrophysics at the same university.

== Awards ==
In 2016, he was awarded the Van Waterschoot van der Gracht Medal.

A main-belt asteroid, 19140 Jansmit, is named after Smit.
