= Lucifer's Hammer =

1977 science fiction novel by Larry Niven and Jerry Pournelle

- First edition
- Author: Larry Niven; Jerry Pournelle
- Cover artist: Anthony Russo
- Language: English
- Genre: Science fiction
- Publisher: Playboy Press (Hardcover Edition), Del Rey
- Publication date: 1977
- Publication place: United States
- Media type: Print (hardback & paperback)
- Pages: 494 pp
- ISBN: 0-87223-487-8
- OCLC: 2966712
- Dewey Decimal: 813/.5/4
- LC Class: PZ4.N734 Lu PS3564.I9

Lucifer's Hammer is a science fiction post-apocalypse-survival novel by American writers Larry Niven and Jerry Pournelle that was first published in 1977. It was nominated for the Hugo Award for Best Novel in 1978.

== Plot summary ==
The book includes descriptions of the formation of the Solar System, where a Saturn-sized trans-Neptunian planet, referred to solely as "the black giant", is ejected from the central Solar System and ends up in the Oort cloud, where its gravitational influence sends a comet towards the inner Solar System.

When wealthy amateur astronomer Tim Hamner co-discovers the comet, named Hamner-Brown for its discoverers, documentary producer Harvey Randall persuades Hamner to have his soap company sponsor a television documentary series on the comet. Political lobbying by California Senator Arthur Jellison eventually gets a joint Apollo-Soyuz (docking with Skylab B) mission approved to study the comet, dubbed "The Hammer" by the media, which is expected to pass close to the Earth.

The scientific community assures the public that a collision with Earth is extremely unlikely, but the comet's nucleus breaks apart and the pieces strike parts of Europe, Africa, the Gulf of Mexico, and the Pacific and Atlantic Oceans. These result in volcanic eruptions, earthquakes, and tsunamis, destroying major coastal cities around the world, killing billions and initiating a new ice age because of the massive quantities of water and debris flung into the atmosphere.

Immediately after the strike, China, anticipating that the Soviet Union will become too cold for its people and must therefore invade its neighbor, launches a preemptive nuclear attack on its neighbor. The Soviets retaliate with their own nuclear missiles, reassuring the US that it is not the target.

Jellison has taken discreet precautions and moved his people and supplies to his ranch. He takes charge and organizes the easily protected valley in the Sierra foothills where his ranch is located, dubbed the "Stronghold". Randall and Hamner separately reach the valley and are allowed in (unlike almost all other refugees). Jet Propulsion Laboratory scientist and resident genius Dan Forrester receives a warm welcome when he reveals that he has hidden a cache of invaluable "how-to" books.

Other groups organize as well. The remnants of a United States Army unit, commanded by Sergeant Hooker, resorts to cannibalism to survive. They are joined by a criminal gang led by Alim Nassor. Together they search in vain for a place that is not too heavily defended, but capable of supporting them all. Reverend Henry Armitage, driven mad by the catastrophe, shows up and absolves the "New Brotherhood Army" of their crimes and cannibalism, stating that they have a mission from God to return humanity to a simpler, non-technological way of life. Their expansion is blocked by the Stronghold, which is also their only serious rival in numbers and strength. They attack, but Jellison's outnumbered forces defeat them with the help of mustard gas and other weapons produced by Forrester.

An operational nuclear power plant nearby is also a target of the New Brotherhood. The defenders barely survive the first assault and plead for help. Jellison's people are reluctant to send it, as the greatly weakened New Brotherhood no longer poses a threat to the Stronghold, but astronaut Rick Delanty gives them a stark choice: remain safe, though their descendants will be peasants, or attack and wipe out the New Brotherhood, and use the electric power to rebuild civilization. Just then, Jellison dies, but not before the ailing old man casts the deciding vote for the latter. They succeed, and later, it is shown that they are well on the way back to restoring civilization.

== Literary significance and reception ==
At least one reference to a prior work by the authors is present in the text, through "Crazy Eddie's Insurance", a direct reference to The Mote in God's Eye (published in 1974).

Judith T. Yamamoto, in her review for the Library Journal, said that the novel was full of "good, solid science, a gigantic but well developed and coordinated cast of characters, and about a megaton of suspenseful excitement". Her one negative comment was that the pro-technology pitch might turn off some readers but "all in all it's a good book, if not a great one". Lucifer's Hammer received a nomination for the Hugo Award for Best Novel in 1978.

C. Ben Ostrander reviewed Lucifer's Hammer in The Space Gamer No. 13. Ostrander commented that "I recommend this book.... Don't miss it for a long, interesting story".

== Legacy ==
Niven and Pournelle originally pitched the story to publishers as an alien invasion story in which the aliens drop a comet onto Earth after humanity fights them. Jim Baen told them to write only the comet story. The original story idea was later written as their novel Footfall.

Two issues of a planned six-part comic book adaptation were published by Innovation Comics in 1993.

Niven and Pournelle wrote a sequel short story, "Story Night at the Stronghold," which was published in the July/August 2016 issue of Analog Science Fiction and Fact and was reprinted in the 2019 collection The Best of Jerry Pournelle and the 2025 collection Future Weird: Science Fiction with a Touch of Strange.

== See also ==
- Impact events in fiction
- The Hammer of God, novel by Arthur C. Clarke about an asteroid strike.
- Seveneves by Neal Stephenson, in which the Moon disintegrates and falls to Earth as "Hard Rain".
- The Star by H.G. Wells, 1897 short story which can be considered the progenitor of this SF sub-genre.
- Malevil by Robert Merle, 1972 post-apocalyptic fiction
