= The Star (Wells short story) =

Short story by H. G. Wells

- Short story by H. G. Wells
- Country: United Kingdom
- Language: English
- Genre: science fiction

Publication

"The Star" is an 1897 apocalyptic short story by H. G. Wells.

== Plot summary ==
On New Year's Day (about 1900, presumably), astronomers announce that the orbit of the planet Neptune has become erratic. Soon it is discovered that a strange luminous object has entered the Solar System, its gravitational pull causing the disturbance. The object is visible in the sky through "any decent instrument" in the constellation of Leo near Regulus.

Although initially it is only of interest to astronomers, eventually the world media announces that the object is on a collision course with Neptune, and a "planetary collision" is predicted. People around the world gather to see the phenomenon. When the collision occurs, the impact causes a massive explosion, merging the two objects into a single massive conflagration. It is seen from Earth as a bright new star in the sky. The impact robs Neptune of its centrifugal force and out of its solar orbit, sending the fireball careening toward the sun.

As it rises each day, the star is noticeably brighter and larger than the day before, and people realize it is nearer. Many panic and take it as a sign of the end times, while others cite the year 1000, in which humanity also anticipated the world's end. Scientists assure the public there is no danger, as they have plotted the Star's trajectory to carry it harmlessly millions of miles from Earth. Most people go on about their lives without concern for the Star as anything more than a curiosity. Meanwhile a mathematician takes days to calculate a new trajectory, factoring the gravitational pull of Jupiter, previously overlooked by other scientists, which will alter the course of the Star and indeed put Earth in its path. The mathematician claims the fireball will either collide with or closely pass Earth. He is largely ridiculed by science deniers, but soon his theory is proven to be accurate.

Even from millions of miles away, the heat of the star causes the winter snow and ice to thaw, and it begins to melt Earth's ice caps and glaciers, causing global flooding. Its gravity causes massive earthquakes, tidal waves, volcanoes and hurricanes around the world. Night is turned into a second day, and the skies become a luminous blue. People everywhere seek shelter in the mountains and caves, or crowd aboard ships braving the tumultuous seas. Massive tidal waves wipe out entire islands. Millions perish.

It seems all hope is lost as the massive star is overwhelmingly bright and hot. A collision seems imminent when suddenly, an inexplicable shadow passes across the land, blocking the unbearable light and heat. People look up to see the star has miraculously passed the Earth, and watch as it continues toward the sun. Later it's determined that the gravity of the Earth's moon diverted the Star away from Earth, saving the fraction of humanity who was able to survive.

The landscape of the Earth has been permanently altered, the equatorial regions uninhabitable. Humans settle in new areas close to the poles, where the climate is more temperate. At the end of the story Martian astronomers have witnessed the event, and observe that not much has changed on the distant planet apart from the melting of ice at the poles.

== Influence ==
An astronomer named Ogilvy appears at the start of the story. An astronomer named Ogilvy also appears at the start of Wells's novel The War of the Worlds.

The early part of the story, before the dire danger had become obvious, includes a reference to a South African city where "a great man had married, and the streets were alight to welcome his return with his bride. 'Even the skies have illuminated,' said the flatterer". This is considered to be a snide reference to Cecil Rhodes, at the height of his power and influence at the time of writing.

The master mathematician's defiance of the Star: "He looked at it as one might look into the eyes of a brave enemy. 'You may kill me,' he said after a silence. 'But I can hold you – and all the universe for that matter – in the grip of this small brain. I would not change. Even now" is a clear statement of 19th century scientific rationalism, the world-view which Wells strongly shared.

This story is often credited with having created a science fiction subgenre depicting the impact event of a planet or star colliding, or near-colliding with Earth – such as the 1933 novel When Worlds Collide by Philip Wylie and Edwin Balmer (made into a film in 1951), Fritz Leiber's The Wanderer (1965), and Lucifer's Hammer by Larry Niven and Jerry Pournelle (1977).

However, it was preceded by two stories in 1894: Omega: The Last Days of the World by Camille Flammarion (the astronomer of the Flammarion Catalog) and Olga Romanoff or, The Syren of the Skies by George Griffith. In 1895, Griffith used a comet disaster again in The Outlaws of the Air. Edgar Allan Poe's 1839 The Conversation of Eiros and Charmion depicted an Earth collision with a comet that altered the atmosphere, causing a higher concentration of Oxygen which subsequently immolates to destroy all life on Earth. Jules Verne's 1877 novel Hector Servadac describes a comet colliding with Earth, taking bits of land (and inhabitants) with it on its orbit around the Sun.

The story is mentioned in Arthur C. Clarke's novel Rendezvous with Rama, and Clarke also used the title for a story of his own.

The radio anthology series Radio Tales adapted the story into an episode called "Asteroid".

The graphic novel Bloodstar uses Wells's story as the prelude to the post-apocalyptic situation in which the plot – itself derived from a short story by Robert E. Howard – is set.

== See also ==
- Impact events in fiction
