= Disaster books =

Literary genre

Disaster books are a literary non-fiction genre involving detailed descriptions of major historical disasters, often based on the historical records or personal testimonies of survivors. Since reportage of both natural disasters and man-made disasters is commonplace, authors tend to be journalists who develop their news reports into books. While usually well written, they can lose sight of the causes, especially in man-made catastrophes where poor engineering, human error or negligence have combined to cause failure. On the other hand, authors who have been directly involved in an accident can reveal facts which have not been widely known, and provide insight into the problem.

== Examples ==
An example of modern vintage is the publication of The High Girders in 1956 by the journalist John Prebble concerning Tay Bridge Disaster of December 28, 1879, one of the worst ever disasters on the rail network in Britain. It is a well composed book and written with good documentary accuracy, the author having accessed the many documents which have survived, especially the massive government report of 1880. On the other hand, he lacks confidence when discussing the engineering defects which lay at the heart of the accident. It did have a very positive benefit in stimulating others to write up their interpretation of the event, such as John Thomas in his New Light on the Tay Bridge Disaster published in 1972. He delved yet further into the archives and produced good evidence to show how faulty construction led directly to failure. Other recent authors such as Peter R Lewis in Beautiful Railway Bridge of the Silvery Tay (2004), have analysed the disaster from an engineering viewpoint, showing how design and construction defects led to destabilisation of the central part of the bridge.

The sinking of the RMS Titanic in April 1912 was vividly recreated by Walter Lord in his A Night to Remember published in 1955, a book that became a best-seller and still remains in print for its accuracy and detail. It was later dramatised in a film of the same name, and most recently in a Hollywood epic. Lord followed it in 1986 with another book on the disaster, revealing testimony from survivors who had hitherto remained silent. His work also stimulated exploration of the wreck itself by Robert Ballard, and much new information emerged from the direct evidence. The ship had broken into two halves during the final stages of the disaster, and each separate part ended up well apart from one another.

== Genre publications ==
=== 1703 Great Storm ===
- An Exact Relation of The Late Dreadful Tempest: Or, A Faithful Account of The Most Remarkable Disaster Which Happened On That Occasion. Faithfully Collected By An Ingenious Hand, To Preserve The Memory Of So Terrible A Judgement. London: A. Baldwin. 1704.

=== 1746 Lima Earthquake ===
- Philotheus, John (1748). A True And Particular History of Earthquakes Containing A Relation Of That Dreadful Earthquake Which Happen'd At Lima And Callao, In Peru, October 28, 1746. London.

=== 1838 Stirling Castle Shipwreck ===
- Curtis, John (1840). Shipwreck Of The Stirling Castle Containing A Faithful Narrative Of The Dreadful Sufferings Of The Crw And The Cruel Murder Of Captain Fraser By The Savages. London: George Virtue.

=== 1839 New England Hurricanes ===
- Awful Calamities: Or, The Shipwrecks of December, 1839. Being A Full Account Of The Dreadful Hurricanes Of Dec. 15, 21, & 27 On The Coast of Massachusetts In Which Were Lost More Than 90 Vessels And More Than 150 Lives Destroyed. Boston: J. Howe. 1840.

=== 1846 Blenden Hall Shipwreck ===
- Greig, Alexander M. (1847). Fate Of The Blenden Hall, East Indiaman: An Account Of Her Wreck, And The Sufferings And Privations Endured By The Survivors. New York: William H. Colyer.

=== 1850 Nassau Bahama Tornado ===
- Woodcock, William J.; R. J. Nelson (1850). Memoranda Of The Bahama Tornado Of 1850. London: Longman, Brown and Co.

=== 1857 Desjardins Railway ===
- Full Details Of The Railway Disaster Of The 12th of March, 1857, At The Desjardin Canal, On The Line of The Great Western Railway. Hamilton: William A. Shepard & Co. 1857.

=== 1878 Wallingford Tornado ===
- Kendrick, John B. (1878). History of the Wallingford Disaster. Hartford, Conn.: The Case, Lockwood & Brainard Co.

=== 1889 Johnstown Flood ===
- Johnson, Willis Fletcher (1889). History Of The Johnstown Flood: Including All The Fearful Record, The Breaking Of The South Fork Dam: The Sweeping Out Of The Conemaugh Valley; The Overthrow Of Johnstown: The Massing Of The Wreck At The Railroad Bridge; Etc. Edgewood Publishing Co.

=== 1891 Spring Hill Mine ===
- Morrow, Robert A. H. (1891). Story Of The Springhill Disaster: Comprising A Full And Authentic Account Of The Great Coal Mining Explosion At Spring Mines, Nova Scotia. Fully Illustrated. St. John, N.R.: R. A. H. Morrow.

=== 1899 New Richmond tornado ===
- Epley, Anna P. (1900). A Modern Herculaneum. Story Of The New Richmond Tornado. New Richmond, Wis.: Anna P. Epley.

=== 1900 Galveston hurricane ===
- Green, Nathan C. (1900). Story Of The Galveston Flood: Complete, Graphic, Authentic. Baltimore: R. H. Woodward Company.
- Halstead, Murat (1900). Galveston: The Horrors Of A Stricken City. American Publishers' Association.
- Lester, Paul (1900). The Great Galveston Disaster: Containing A Full And Thrilling Account Of The Most Appalling Calamity Of Modern Times. International Publishing Company.

=== 1903 Iroquois Theater Fire ===
- Everett, Marshall; Samuel Fallows (1904). "Lest We Forget", Chicago's Awful Theater Horror, By The Survivors And Rescuers. London: Memorial Publishing Co.

=== 1906 San Francisco earthquake ===
- Aitken, Frank W.; Edward Hilton (1906). A History Of The Earthquake And Fire In San Francisco. San Francisco: The Edward Hilton Co.
- Banks, Charles Eugene; Opie Percival Read (1906). The History Of The San Francisco Disaster And Mount Vesuvius Horror. C. E. Thomas.
- Givens, John David; Opie Percival Read (1906). San Francisco In Ruins: A Pictorial History. San Francisco: Leon C. Osteyee.
- Keeler, Charles (1906). San Francisco Through Earthquake And Fire. San Francisco: Paul Elder And Company.
- Morris, Charles (1906). The San Francisco Calamity By Earthquake And Fire. J. C. Winston Company. ISBN 978-0-8065-0984-6.
- Tyler, Sydney; Ralph Stockman Tarr (1908). San Francisco's Great Disaster. Philadelphia: P. W. Ziegler Co.
- White, Trumbull; Richard Linthicum (1906). Complete Story of the San Francisco Horror. Hubert D. Russell.

=== 1913 Great Dayton Flood and Omaha Easter Sunday Tornado ===
- Everett, Marshall (1913). Tragic Story Of America's Greatest Disaster: Tornado, Flood and Fire In Ohio, Indiana, Nebraska And Mississippi Valley. A Graphic And Startling Account of The Most Thrilling Personal Experiences, Awful Tragedies, Miraculous Escapes, Acts of Herois and Self-Sacrifice, Told By The Survivors And Rescuers. Chicago: J. S. Ziegler Company.
- Funk, Nellis R. (1913). A Pictorial History Of The Great Dayton Flood. Dayton: The Otterbein Press.
- Herbert, Thomas; J. Martin Miller (1913). America's Greatest Flood and Tornado Calamity: Authentic Story Of These Appalling Disasters, Graphics And Complete Accounts of The Terrible Floods In Ohio, Indiana And Other States. Hundred Swept Into Eternity. Soul-Stirring Stories Told By Eyewitnesses. Thomas H. Morrison.
- Marshall, Logan (1913). The True Story Of Our National Calamity Of Flood, Fire and Tornado: The Appalling Loss Of Life, The Terrible Suffering Of The Homeless, The Struggles For Safety. L. T. Myers.
- Kiel, Danny Z. (2016). Corpses in Trees and Rats on a Raft: The Great Dayton Flood of 1913. Indianapolis: DZK. p. 77.

=== 1913 Omaha Easter Sunday Tornado ===
- Sing, Travis (2003). Omaha's Easter Tornado of 1913. Mt. Pleasant, SC: Arcadia Publishing. p. 128. ISBN 978-0-7385-3184-7.

=== 1914 Empress of Ireland ===
- Marshall, Logan (1914). The Tragic Story Of The Empress Of Ireland: An Authentic Account Of The Most Horrible Disaster In Canadian History. L. T. Myers.

== See also ==
- Disaster
- Disasters in popular culture
- Disaster films
- Hyperbole
