= Alvarez hypothesis =

Asteroid impact hypothesis

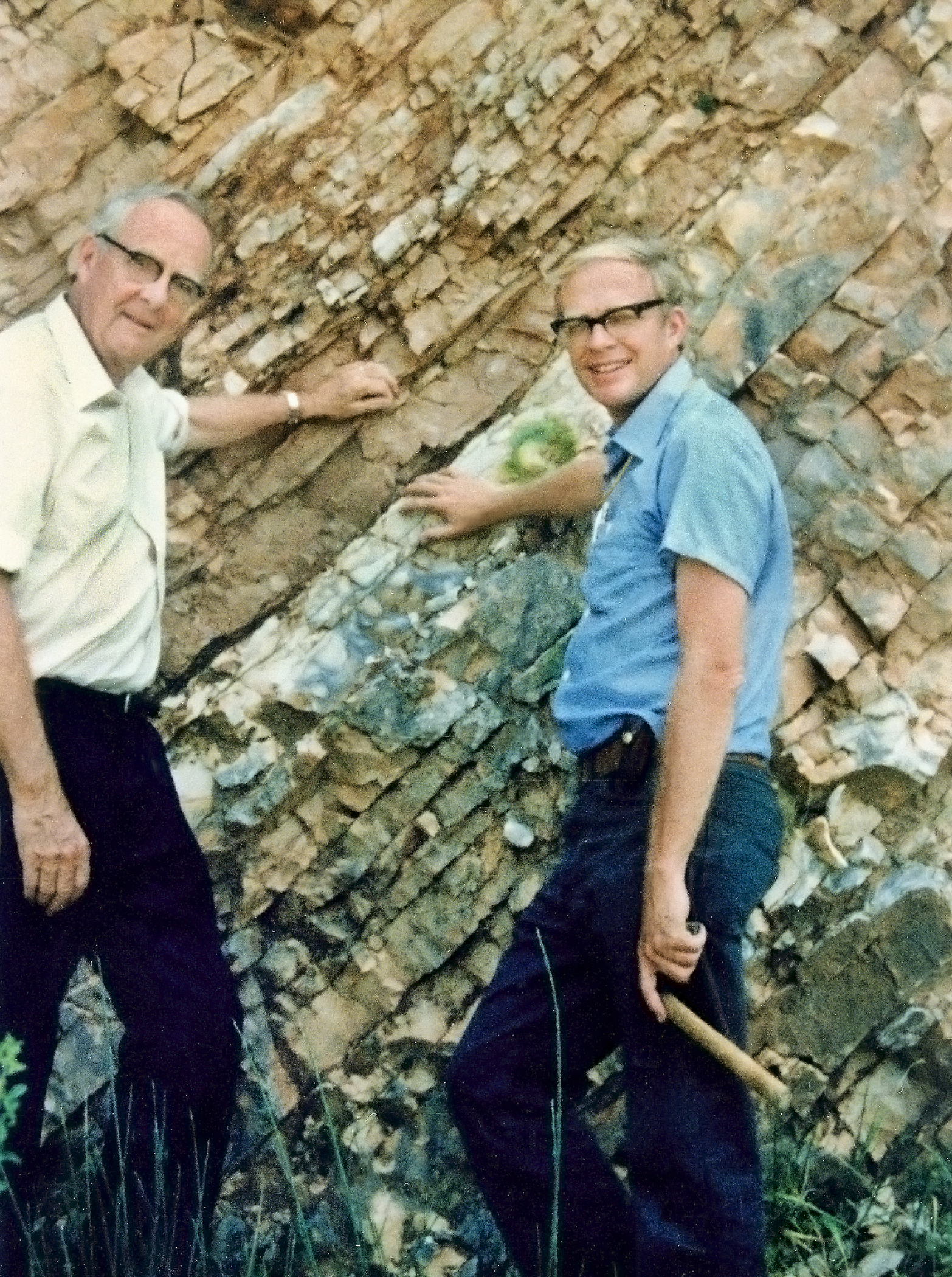
Luis Walter Alvarez, left, and his son Walter, right, at the K–T boundary in Gubbio, Italy, 1981

The Alvarez hypothesis posits that the mass extinction of the non-avian dinosaurs and many other living things during the Cretaceous–Paleogene extinction event was caused by the impact of a large asteroid on the Earth. Prior to 2013, it was commonly cited as having happened about 65 million years ago, but Renne and colleagues (2013) gave an updated value of 66 million years. Evidence indicates that the asteroid fell in the Yucatán Peninsula, at Chicxulub, Mexico. The hypothesis is named after the father-and-son team of scientists Luis and Walter Alvarez, who first suggested it in 1980. Shortly afterwards, and independently, the same was suggested by Dutch paleontologist Jan Smit.

In March 2010, an international panel of scientists endorsed the asteroid hypothesis, specifically the Chicxulub impact, as being the cause of the extinction. A team of 41 scientists reviewed 20 years of scientific literature and in so doing also ruled out other theories such as massive volcanism. They had determined that a space rock 10–15 km (6–9 mi) in diameter hurtled into earth at Chicxulub. For comparison, the Martian moon Phobos has a diameter of 22 km (14 mi), and Mount Everest is just under 9 km (5.6 mi). The collision would have released the same energy as 100,000,000 megatonnes of TNT (4.2×10^{23} J), over a billion times the energy of the atomic bombs dropped on Hiroshima and Nagasaki.

A 2016 drilling project into the peak ring of the crater strongly supported the hypothesis, and confirmed various matters that had been unclear until that point. These included the fact that the peak ring comprised granite (a rock found deep within the Earth) rather than typical sea floor rock, which had been shocked, melted, and ejected to the surface in minutes, and evidence of colossal seawater movement directly afterwards from sand deposits. Crucially, the cores also showed a near-complete absence of gypsum, a sulfate-containing rock, which would have been vaporized and dispersed as an aerosol into the atmosphere, confirming the presence of a probable link between the impact and global longer-term effects on the climate and food chain.

== History ==
In 1980, a team of researchers led by Nobel prize-winning physicist Luis Alvarez, his son geologist Walter Alvarez, and chemists Frank Asaro and Helen Vaughn Michel, discovered that sedimentary layers found all over the world at the Cretaceous–Paleogene boundary (K–Pg boundary, formerly called Cretaceous–Tertiary or K–T boundary) contain a concentration of iridium hundreds of times greater than normal.

Previously, in a 1953 publication, geologists Allan O. Kelly and Frank Dachille analyzed global geological evidence suggesting that one or more giant asteroids impacted the Earth, causing an angular shift in its axis, global floods, firestorms, atmospheric occlusion, and the extinction of the dinosaurs. There were other earlier speculations on the possibility of an impact event, but without strong confirming evidence.

== Evidence and projects ==
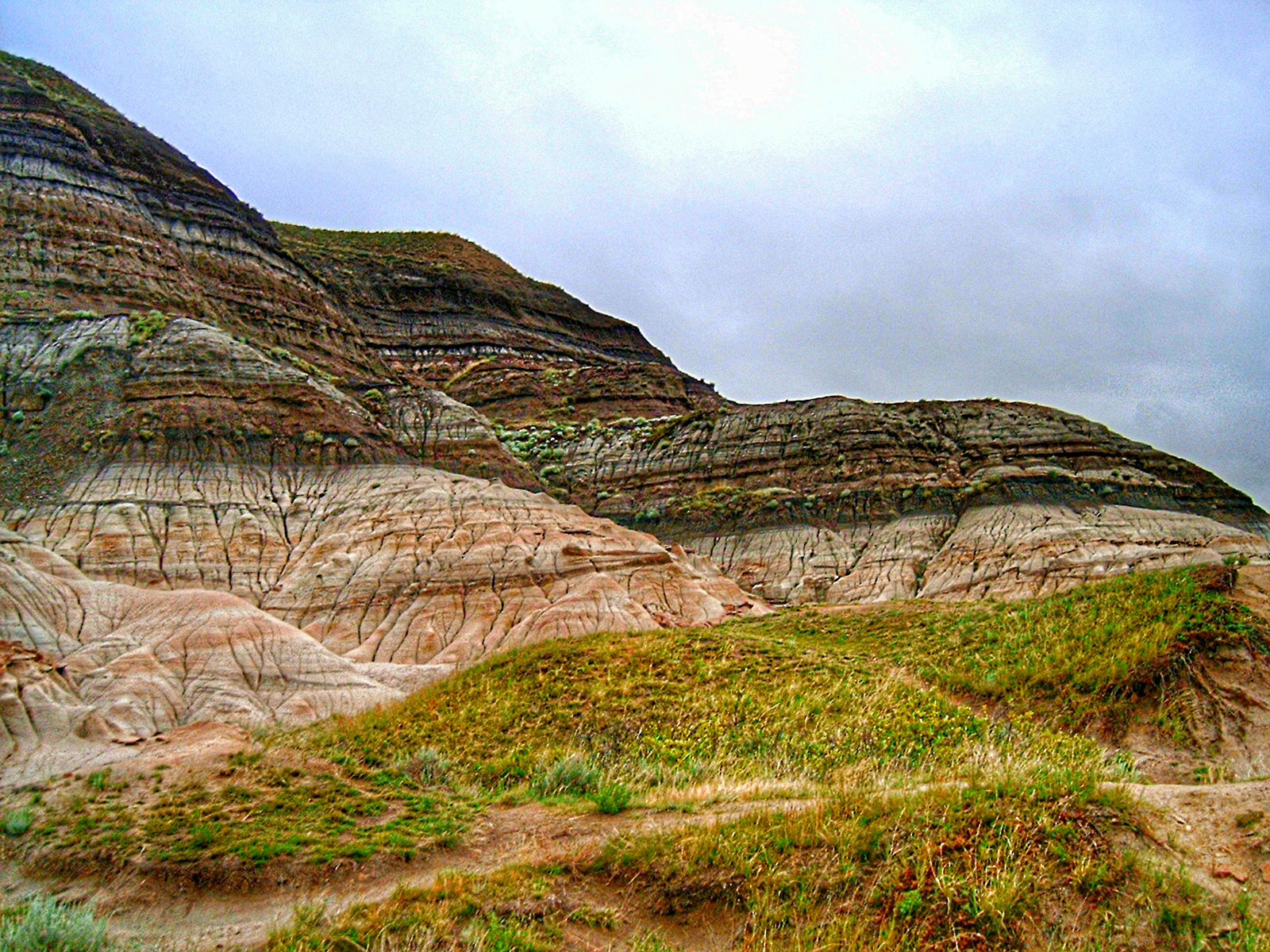
Badlands near Drumheller, Alberta where erosion has exposed the K–Pg boundary.

The location of the impact was unknown when the Alvarez team developed their hypothesis, but later scientists discovered the Chicxulub Crater in the Yucatán Peninsula, now considered the likely impact site.

Paul Renne of the Berkeley Geochronology Center has reported that the date of the asteroid event is 66,038,000 years ago, plus or minus 11,000 years, based on Ar-Ar dating. He further posits that the mass extinction of dinosaurs occurred within 33,000 years of this date.

In April 2019, a paper was published in PNAS which describes evidence from a fossil site in North Dakota that the authors say provides a "postimpact snapshot" of events after the asteroid collision "including ejecta accretion and faunal mass death". The team found that the tektites that had peppered the area were present in amber found on the site and were also embedded in the gills of about 50 percent of the fossil fish. They were also able to find traces of iridium. The authors – who include Walter Alvarez – postulate that shock of the impact, equivalent to an earthquake of magnitude 10 or 11, may have led to seiches, oscillating movements of water in lakes, bays, or gulfs, that would have reached the site in North Dakota within minutes or hours of the impact. This would have led to the rapid burial of organisms under a thick layer of sediment. Coauthor David Burnham of the University of Kansas was quoted as saying, "They’re not crushed, it’s like an avalanche that collapses almost like a liquid, then sets like concrete. They were killed pretty suddenly because of the violence of that water. We have one fish that hit a tree and was broken in half."

According to a high-resolution study of fossilized fish bones published in 2022, the Cretaceous-Paleogene asteroid which caused mass extinction impacted during the Northern Hemisphere spring.

In 2016, a scientific drilling project drilled deep into the peak ring of the Chicxulub impact crater, to obtain rock core samples from the impact itself. The discoveries were widely seen as confirming current theories related to both the crater impact, and its effects. They confirmed that the rock composing the peak ring had been subjected to immense pressures and forces and had been melted by immense heat and shocked by immense pressure from its usual state into its present form in just minutes; the fact that the peak ring was made of granite was also significant, since granite is not a rock found in sea-floor deposits, it originates much deeper in the Earth and had been ejected to the surface by the immense pressures of impact; that gypsum, a sulfate-containing rock that is usually present in the shallow seabed of the region, had been almost entirely removed and must therefore have been almost entirely vaporized and entered the atmosphere, and that the event was immediately followed by a huge megatsunami (a massive movement of sea waters) sufficient to lay down the largest known layer of sand separated by grain size directly above the peak ring.

These strongly support the hypothesis that the impactor was large enough to create a 120-mile peak ring, to melt, shock and eject basement granite from the mid-crust deep within the Earth, to create colossal water movements, and to eject an immense quantity of vaporized rock and sulfates into the atmosphere, where they would have persisted for a long time. This global dispersal of dust and sulfates would have led to a sudden and catastrophic effect on the climate worldwide, large temperature drops, and devastated the food chain.

== Alternative theories ==
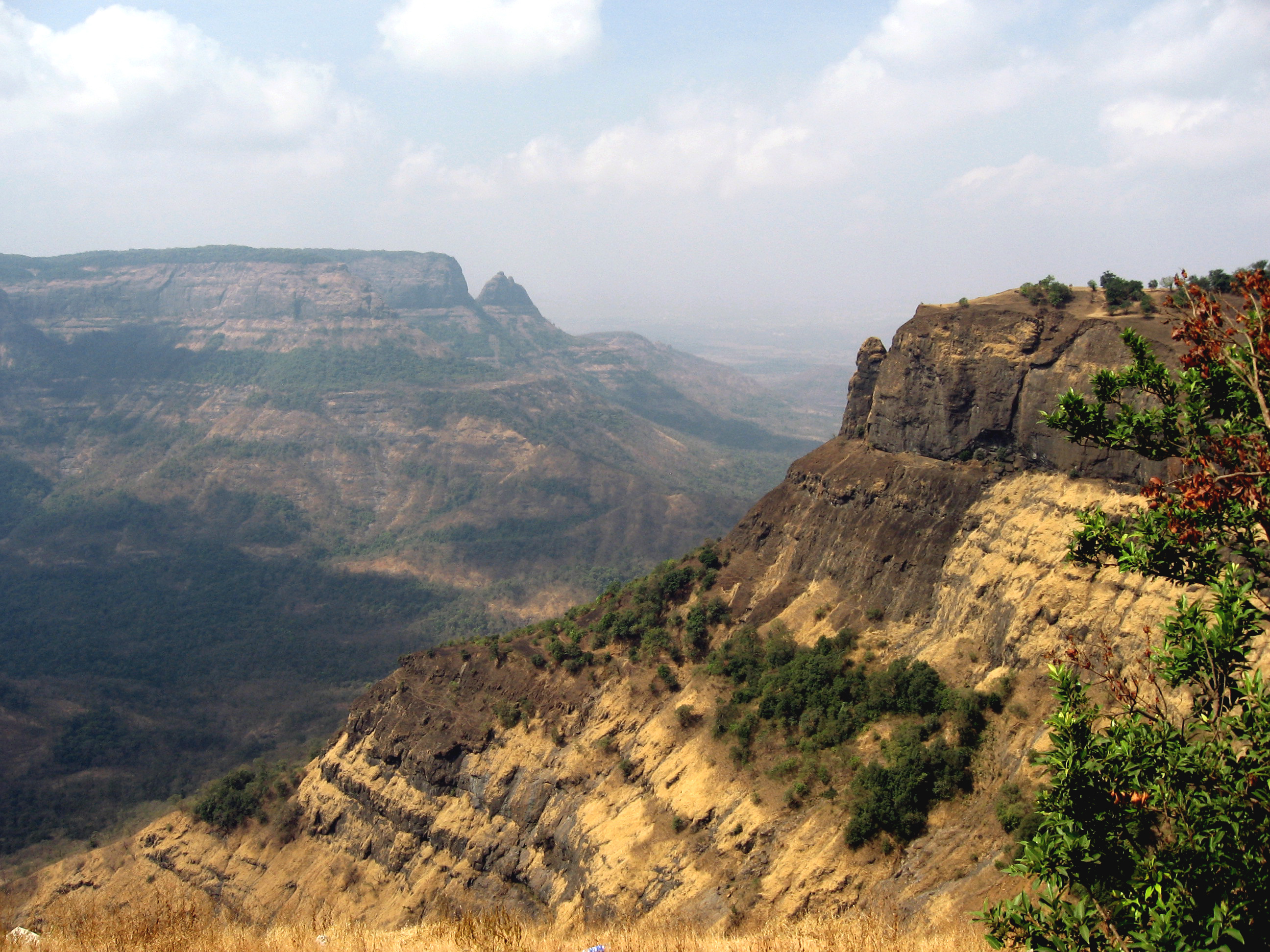
The Western Ghats, a province within the Deccan Traps that has been thoroughly studied

Although a 2010 paper published in Science that declared that the extinction of the dinosaurs was caused by Chicxulub was co-authored by 41 scientists, dozens of other scientists challenged both the paper's methods and its conclusions. A leading critic of the Alvarez hypothesis is Gerta Keller, who has focused on Deccan Traps volcanism as a likely cause of a more gradual extinction. Despite the fact that the Alvarez hypothesis has overwhelming support from the scientific community, Keller has continued to advocate for research into alternate theories. The Deccan Traps theory was first proposed in 1978 by geologist Dewey McLean but quickly lost traction. The Deccan Traps are an area of volcanic flood basalts in Western India spanning ~1.3 million square kilometers that were created by massive volcanic activity during the same time period in which the Chicxulub impact occurred. Prior to Keller's research, the timeframe of the Deccan Traps' eruptions had a significantly large range of error, making it difficult to draw strong conclusions regarding their connection to the K-Pg extinction. In a 2014 report, Keller and her colleagues used uranium-lead zircon geochronology to more accurately identify the eruptions as occurring both within a span of one million years and around 250,000 years prior to the K-Pg boundary. Keller additionally determined that ocean temperatures rose seven to nine degrees Celsius during the most significant period of the Deccan eruptions. Along with ocean acidification, ozone reduction, acid rain, and a release of harmful gases, she asserts that these conditions were sufficient to have initiated the mass extinction. Keller has specifically rejected the Alvarez hypothesis, pointing to evidence she gathered from the Chicxulub crater in 2009 revealing that twenty inches of sediment separates the impact from the extinction. The finding suggests that the impact occurred 200,000 to 300,000 years before the K-Pg extinction, a period far too large for the two to be correlated. This, however, contrasts the range of 33,000 years determined by Paul Renne in 2015, as well the more recent assertion that a tsunami generated by the impact created the unusual sediment layer. Keller additionally claims that the impact did not cause as much ecological damage as is widely believed, and she determined that many foraminifera species began to decline well before the impact event occurred. Her 2009 project revealed that the 52 species found in the sediment prior to the impact were present in the sediment following it, suggesting that the impact caused minimal extinction.

A more recent theory combining both Deccan volcanism and the impact hypothesis has been developed by teams at UC Berkeley led by Paul Renne and Mark Richards. This theory proposes that the impact itself instigated the most intense period of Deccan eruptions, both of which had devastating effects contributing to the K-Pg extinction. Renne and Richards calculated that the Chicxulub impact was capable of producing seismic activity strong enough to initiate volcanic eruptions. They determined that the largest period of Deccan volcanic eruptions, or the Wai subgroup, occurred 50,000 to 100,000 years after the Chicxulub impact, which is consistent with theoretical predictions modeling the length of time after which eruptions should occur. The group also confirmed that the length of time between the extinction and subsequent biological recovery was consistent with the length of Deccan volcanic activity, proposing that the eruptions paused the recovery of the marine ecosystems destroyed by the impact.

Debate regarding the cause of the K-Pg extinction has proven to be extremely controversial among researchers, and the resilience of its intensity has earned it the moniker of the "dinosaur wars." Criticism is unusually harsh, targeting not only research findings but the credibility and integrity of the scientists themselves. Verbal accusations have been thrown both by and toward many prominent researchers including Gerta Keller and Luis Alvarez, discouraging civil debate and in some cases threatening careers. Walter Alvarez is an active member of the UC Berkeley team researching the connection between Deccan volcanism and the Chicxulub impact.
