= Footfall =

1985 science fiction novel by Larry Niven and Jerry Pournelle

- Cover of first edition (hardcover)
- Author: Larry Niven; Jerry Pournelle
- Cover artist: Michael Whelan
- Language: English
- Genre: Science fiction
- Publisher: Del Rey Books
- Publication date: May 12, 1985
- Publication place: United States
- Media type: Print (hardback & paperback)
- Pages: 495 pages (first edition, hardcover)
- ISBN: 0-345-32347-5 (first edition, hardcover)
- OCLC: 11316829
- Dewey Decimal: 813/.54 19
- LC Class: PS3564.I9 F6 1985

Footfall is a 1985 science fiction novel by American writers Larry Niven and Jerry Pournelle. The book depicts the arrival of members of an alien species called the Fithp that have traveled to the Solar System from Alpha Centauri in a large spacecraft driven by a Bussard ramjet. Their intent is conquest of the planet Earth.

== Plot ==
The alien Fithp resemble baby elephants with multiple prehensile trunks. They possess more advanced technology than humans, but did not develop any of it on their own. In the distant past on their planet, another species was dominant. The predecessor species badly damaged the environment, rendering itself and many other species extinct, but left behind their knowledge inscribed on large stone cubes from which the Fithp gained their technology. An arms race between two rival herds threatened to render the species extinct, so they wagered to see who would depart in a starship and seek a new home elsewhere. The leadership of the loser formed the Chtaptisk Fithp ('Traveling Herd').

The herd was divided into "Sleepers" and the "Spaceborn", as the starship is both a generation ship and a sleeper ship. The original leaders are subordinate to the Spaceborn, who are prepared to start a space-based civilization, but are still dedicated to the generations-old goal of conquest.

The Fithp are herd creatures and fight wars differently from humans. When two herds meet, they fight until it is evident which is dominant. Fighting then ceases, and the losers are incorporated into the winning herd. The Fithp are confused by human attempts at peaceful contact. Upon arrival, they attack the Soviet space station, the country still being a world superpower, where Soviets and Americans wait to greet them. They proceed to destroy military sites and important infrastructure on Earth. US Congressman Wes Dawson and Soviet cosmonauts are captured from the ruins of the space station.

The human characters fall into two major groups: those on Earth and those who are taken aboard the Fithp spaceship as captives. Civilians are used to show the effects of the war on day-to-day life in the US, and military and government personnel convey a more strategic overview of events. Science fiction writers are employed as technical advisers on alien technology and behavior; the characters are based on real writers, including Niven ("Nat Reynolds"), Pournelle ("Wade Curtis"), and Robert Anson Heinlein ("Bob Anson").

After their initial assault, the Fithp land ground forces in the center of North America, primarily in and around Kansas. They initially repel attacks with orbital lasers and kinetic energy weapons, but a combined Soviet and US nuclear attack wipes out their beachhead. The Fithp, who are familiar with nuclear weapons, but prefer to use cleaner ones, are shocked by what they consider the barbarity of humans' willingness to "sow radioactive fire on their own croplands". The Fithp respond to the defeat of their invasion by dropping a large asteroid into the Indian Ocean, whose impact results in environmental damage on a global scale, particularly the almost total destruction of India. The Fithp then invade southern Africa, successfully subjugating most of its people. On numerous occasions, the Fithp are assisted by human leaders seeking to keep their power over the masses.

The US secretly builds a large, heavily armed spacecraft in Bellingham, Washington state that is propelled by nuclear bombs, a real concept known as Project Orion. The ship is named after the Biblical archangel Michael, who cast Lucifer out of Heaven. When there is a security leak, Michael launches prematurely and battles through small enemy "digit" ships, aided by one-man gunships and larger space shuttles carried aboard Michael and released as needed. Though seriously damaged, Michael pursues the alien mothership. One of the shuttles rams the Fithp ship, damaging it badly enough that it cannot escape Michael.

On Earth, US President David Coffey receives an offer of conditional surrender from the Fithp. Coffey is willing to let the Fithp withdraw into space and is reluctant to destroy their technology and cargo of females and children. He is opposed by his advisors, who feel that by allowing the Fithp to escape and regroup, he risks the whole of humanity. When Coffey seemingly folds under the pressure, National Security Adviser Admiral Carrell stages a bloodless coup d'état, circumventing the President and rejecting the aliens' proposal. An act of sabotage by the humans aboard the alien vessel disables the Fithp engines, allowing Michael to inflict heavy damage, which forces the Fithp to accept humanity as the stronger species and surrender themselves to become part of the human "herd". In the final scene, the Fithp leader lies on his back and allows the former captive Dawson to place his foot on his chest, which is the formal Fithp gesture of surrender.

== Timeline ==
- c. 1915: The Chtaptisk Fithp ("Traveler Herd") leave Alpha Centauri for Earth on their spacecraft, the Thuktun Flishithy ("Message Bearer").
- c. 1919: The sleepers go into their death-sleep.
- September 1976: Thuktun Flishithy swings around the Sun, maneuvering towards Saturn.
- November 1976: Thuktun Flishithy reaches Saturn.
- June 1980: Thuktun Flishithy has been resupplied.
- June 1981: The Fithp have established themselves on the Foot, an asteroid colony.
- April 1985: The Thuktun Flishithy begins its journey towards the Earth.
- May 1985: Human astronomers in Hawaii realize that there is an alien ship on a trajectory towards the Earth.
- June 1985: The initial attack of the Fithp. Kinetic weapons wreak havoc on the Earth, and satellites are shot down. The Soviet space station Kosmograd is destroyed and its surviving passengers captured.
- July 1985: The Fithp launch an invasion of Kansas. Shortly thereafter the Jayhawk Wars begin, a conventional attack against Fithp forces that is rapidly destroyed using space support. About two weeks later, the Americans and Soviets co-operate in a combined nuclear retaliation that defeats the Fithp forces and wrecks much of Kansas in the process.
- August 1985: Footfall. The Fithp drop the Foot into the Indian Ocean. Tsunamis devastate surrounding landmasses, and the entire globe is enveloped in an endless salty rainstorm. India is practically destroyed, and the Fithp successfully invade much of Africa.
- July 1986: The flight of the Michael, ending with the formal surrender of the Chtaptisk Fithp to Wes Dawson.

== Reception ==
Kirkus Reviews commented, "Overblown and largely underdone." It judged the novel to be "more tedious and less thoughtful" than previous joint Niven–Pournelle works, with "barely relevant" subplots and a "cumbersome cast of thousands" but praising the Fithp society as "particularly well worked-out."

Dave Langford reviewed Footfall for White Dwarf #71, and stated that "Their flaws are blockbuster flaws: momentum takes 100 pages to build, several of the teeming characters are dispensable, and megadeaths are glossed over. [...] All the same, I read most of it twice and ran out of adrenalin." James Nicoll found it to have "the mediocrity and tedium of a much longer novel," with a weak characterization and a scientifically-inaccurate portrayal of the effects of the asteroid's impact, but conceded that it was better than most other works in its subgenre and commended Niven for his portrayal of the Fithp.

Footfall was nominated for the 1986 Hugo Award for Best Novel and the 1986 Locus Award for Best Science Fiction Novel, and was a No. 1 New York Times Bestseller.

== See also ==
- Lucifer's Hammer, another Pournelle-Niven novel with an apocalyptic kinetic strike by an extraterrestrial bolide.
