= Paul Renne =

American geologist

Paul R. Renne (born 1957 in San Antonio, Texas) is an American academic who is the director of the Berkeley Geochronology Center and also Professor in Residence of geology in the Department of Earth & Planetary Science, University of California, Berkeley (UC Berkeley). Renne is considered a leading expert on the argon–argon dating technique and is interested in paleomagnetism in Earth history, precisely dating flood basalts, particularly the Siberian Traps, and large igneous province volcanism in general, and paleoanthropology. Renne received his A.B. and his Ph.D. in geology from UC Berkeley.
