= Berkeley Geochronology Center =

The Berkeley Geochronology Center (BGC) is a non-profit geochronology research institute in Berkeley, California. It was originally a research group in the laboratory of geochronologist Garniss Curtis at the University of California, Berkeley. The center is now an independent scientific research institute with close Berkeley affiliations and directed by geologist and geochronologist Paul Renne, a professor in residence in the department of earth and planetary science at Berkeley.

== History ==
In 1985, Curtis, set to retire in 1989, moved the group from his lab at the university to the basement of the independent Institute for Human Origins (IHO), at the suggestion of American anthropologist F. Clark Howell. The geochronologists worked separately from the IHO, although IHO contained their bureaucratic infrastructure, until 1989 when they became officially known as the Institute for Human Origins Geochronology Center. In 1994 the group officially split from the IHO based on different viewpoints of their respective missions.

Both Curtis and IHO founder, Donald Johanson, were known to have egos that might "clash", but Howell thought that bringing the two research groups together could benefit both. The IHO's mission included publicizing the anthropology of ancient human ancestors to the general public, and the geochronology scientists felt the anthropologists emphasized this at the expense of more basic science, while the paleoanthropologist felt the geochronologists were devoting too much research time and funding to general geology questions not related to the institute's primary mission. The anthropologists had more public recognition in the press, while the geochronologists were obtaining more scientific grant moneys and publishing more scientific papers. The split was acrimonious and garnered negative publicity for some of those involved from their peers in professional organizations, particularly as Gordon Getty, the single largest donor and a board member of IHO, withdrew funding to the parent institute (IHO) while providing start-up funding to the geochronology group.

== Functions ==
The Institute specializes in fundamental questions of the age of the Earth, using state-of-the-art instrumentation to find the age of rocks that will answer questions about geology and geobiology in Earth's history. The institute is capable of performing gas extraction, and thermal ionization mass spectrometry analysis on rocks up to billions of years old using the techniques of argon–argon dating and uranium–lead dating. BGC also performs paleomagnetic analysis to establish correlating or independent ages from the fossilized magnetic fields. The staff includes research scientists specializing in various geological periods and areas, in addition to postdoctoral scholars and graduate students. Scientists at BGC have also been active in dating extraterrestrial materials such as meteorites.
