= The Wanderer (Leiber novel) =

1964 novel by Fritz Leiber

- Cover of first edition (paperback)
- Author: Fritz Leiber
- Language: English
- Genre: Science fiction
- Publisher: Ballantine Books
- Publication date: 1964
- Publication place: United States
- Media type: Print (hardback & paperback)
- Pages: 318
- Award: Hugo Award for Best Novel (1965)
- ISBN: 0-575-07112-5 (SF Masterworks series edition)
- OCLC: 313201279
- LC Class: PS3523.E4583 W3 2001

The Wanderer is a science fiction novel by American writer Fritz Leiber, published as a paperback original by Ballantine Books in 1964. It won the 1965 Hugo Award for Best Novel.

Following its initial paperback edition, The Wanderer was reissued in hardcover by Walker & Co. in 1969, by Gregg Press in 1980, and by the Easton Press in 1991, as well as a Science Fiction Book Club edition in 1987. It was released in hardcover in the UK by Dennis Dobson in 1967, with a paperback edition following from Penguin Books in 1969. Translations have appeared in Dutch, French, German, Hungarian and Italian.

The Wanderer was the first novel to win the Hugo Award without previously being published in hardcover or appearing in some form in a genre magazine.

The novel deals with a wandering planet that enters the Solar System. Its narrative follows multiple disconnected groups of characters to portray the widespread impact of the Wanderer on the entire population of the Earth (and above it) as well as the varied reactions of different groups as they struggle to cope and survive.

== Plot ==
The novel is set in a future, a few years after its 1964 publication date. The Space Race is still ongoing. Both the US and the USSR have lunar bases, but the Soviets have retained their early lead by sending an expedition to Mars. The Vietnam War continues, but seems not to be a big issue for US citizens. Also an underground anti-Communist army now operates within North Vietnam. Some independent outsiders bring supplies by sea to both sides. Technology is much the same, apart from better spaceflight.

From the point of view of most of the population of the Earth, a new planet appears out of nowhere close to the Moon towards the end of a total lunar eclipse. It is attended by a twinkling of stars, which some astronomers explain as the planet emerging out of hyperspace. This is later confirmed by a man captured by a feline humanoid, and she also explains that the moon was destroyed to fuel the wandering planet.

The planet's appearance is startling: several massive patterns of purple and gold, and initially resembling the Tao symbol of human culture.

Within a few days the planet—soon referred to by everyone simply as "The Wanderer"—consumes the Moon. Its gravity causes mass death and destruction as it raises huge ocean waves and causes earthquakes and volcanic eruptions. Flying saucers appear, apparently trying to mitigate some of the disastrous effects. Then, after a spectacular battle in space between the new planet and yet another which had appeared just as suddenly, the skies are empty again. Earth is left without its Moon.

The novel follows the lives of disparate people around the globe. There is a man attempting a solo crossing of the Atlantic Ocean, a smuggler operating off the coast of Vietnam, two friends in England, a trio of drug addicts in New York City, and the military controllers of the USA Moon mission, deep in a bunker somewhere near Washington, D.C.

The main protagonists are three longtime friends. Paul Hagbolt is escorting Margo Gelhorn (and her cat, Miaow) to observe the lunar eclipse at an observatory in California. Their friend, and Margo's fiancé, is Don Merriam, one of the American astronauts at the Moon base. Following on a whim a sign advertising a "flying saucer symposium", Paul and Margo fall in with a group of intellectuals, dreamers, charlatans and misfits. At that point events overtake them. The new planet appears and triggers an earthquake that buries their cars in a landslide. They must avoid tsunamis, more earthquakes, roving mobs and flying saucers to survive. On the Moon Don Merriam is the only astronaut to escape the destruction of the American moonbase. He tries to take off in one of the base's spaceships, only to fall through the Moon itself as it splits asunder under the influence of the new planet. His ship is eventually captured by its crew.

Events take a bizarre turn when the group of saucer enthusiasts is faced with a tsunami. A flying saucer appears, and a cat-like being uses some kind of gun to repel the waves. Then the being uses the same device to pull Paul, who is holding Miaow, into the saucer. At the same time the gun falls into the hands of the people on the ground.

In the saucer Paul meets a being calling itself Tigerishka. A large, female telepathic feline creature, she initially mistakes Miaow as the intelligent being (whose thoughts she can hear), and Paul as a "monkey". Realizing her mistake, she regards Paul with contempt. Monkey-beings are not well regarded by her people. However she slowly warms to him, and explains why her planet had consumed the Moon.

Like many of the human characters, her people are intellectuals, dreamers, charlatans and misfits. They belong to a culture that spans the Universe, has achieved immortality, and can construct planets and traverse hyperspace. They can even create bodies for themselves that reflect the origins of their races, such as Tigerishka's cat-form. They are, however, fleeing their culture's police. The standard culture rejects nonconformists, and devotes itself to ensuring that intelligent life survives to the end of time, whereas Tigerishka's cohort wants to explore hyperspace and tinker with space, time and the Mind. Their flight has brought them to Earth orbit to refuel as huge amounts of matter must be converted to energy to power their hyperspace drive and their weapons: the Wanderer is running on empty.

As alien as Tigerishka is, Paul becomes besotted with her. Tigerishka eventually yields to his advances. At the same time, Don Merriam has been rescued with his ship by the Wanderer's other spaceships. He is reunited with Paul aboard Tigerishka's ship. Now they must testify in the Wanderer's trial, for the police have arrived. A second planet, "The Stranger", colored a dull gray where the Wanderer is bright purple and yellow, appears and threatens battle. Don and Paul give their testimony as to the good treatment they have seen, along with thousands of other humans appearing by some kind of holographic projection. However the trial goes badly. Paul and Don are evacuated in Don's ship, placed into position close to Earth by Tigerishka. Tigerishka takes Miaow with her back to her planet. Then the final battle takes place, and both planets disappear. In the final scene, Margo and her companions walk to Vandenberg Spaceport as Don's ship comes in to land.

== Reception ==
P. Schuyler Miller described the book as a "thoroughly uncharacteristic" Leiber novel, saying that "the feel of what is happening . . . counts for more than the plot" and predicting that The Wanderer "would eventually be awarded 'classic' status". Avram Davidson compared the novel unfavorably to Leiber's Conjure Wife, saying "The canvas is wide, the characters many, the charge scatters like buckshot, if you can imagine a buckshot cannon".

James Nicoll has described the novel as "terrible", saying that although its premise — "hollow planets filled with catgirls who want to steal the moon" — may be "amazing or at least intriguing", the novel itself "falls well short of its potential"; he attributes its Hugo win to a weak slate of nominees, and to Leiber's "blatant and unabashed sucking up to SF fandom".

== Availability ==
The Wanderer is available in paperback under ISBN 0-575-07112-5 (Gollancz, 2000) as part of the SF Collectors' Editions series.
