= Chekhov's Journey =

1983 novel by Ian Watson

First edition (publ. Gollancz)

Chekhov's Journey is a novel by Ian Watson published in 1983.

== Plot summary ==
Chekhov's Journey is a novel in which a modern-day actor uses hypnosis to simulate Anton Chekhov's 1890 journey through Siberia.

== Reception ==
Dave Langford reviewed Chekhov's Journey for White Dwarf #40, and stated that "There are good twists in this neatly executed story, which is as 'conventional' a reality-bending yarn as Watson has written. Lacking the vaulting ambition of his God's World or the outrageousness of the recent Deathhunter, it's good entertainment with some philosophical bite."

== Reviews ==
- Review by Faren Miller (1983) in Locus, #267 April 1983
- Review by Nick Lowe (1983) in Foundation, #28 July 1983
- Review by John Clute (1983) in Interzone, #5 Autumn 1983
- Review by Tom Easton (1990) in Analog Science Fiction and Fact, July 1990
- Review by Don D'Ammassa (1991) in Science Fiction Chronicle, #140 June 1991
