= Larry Niven =

American science fiction writer (born 1938)

- Niven at Dragon Con in 2026
- Born: Laurence van Cott Niven; April 30, 1938 (age 88); Los Angeles, California, U.S.
- Education: California Institute of Technology; Washburn University (BA)
- Occupation: Novelist
- Writing career
- Period: 1964–present
- Genres: Hard science fiction; Fantasy
- Notable works: Ringworld (1970); The Mote in God's Eye (1974); Lucifer's Hammer (1977); The Ringworld Engineers (1980); Dream Park (1981)
- Notable awards: Inkpot Award (1979)
- Website: larryniven.net

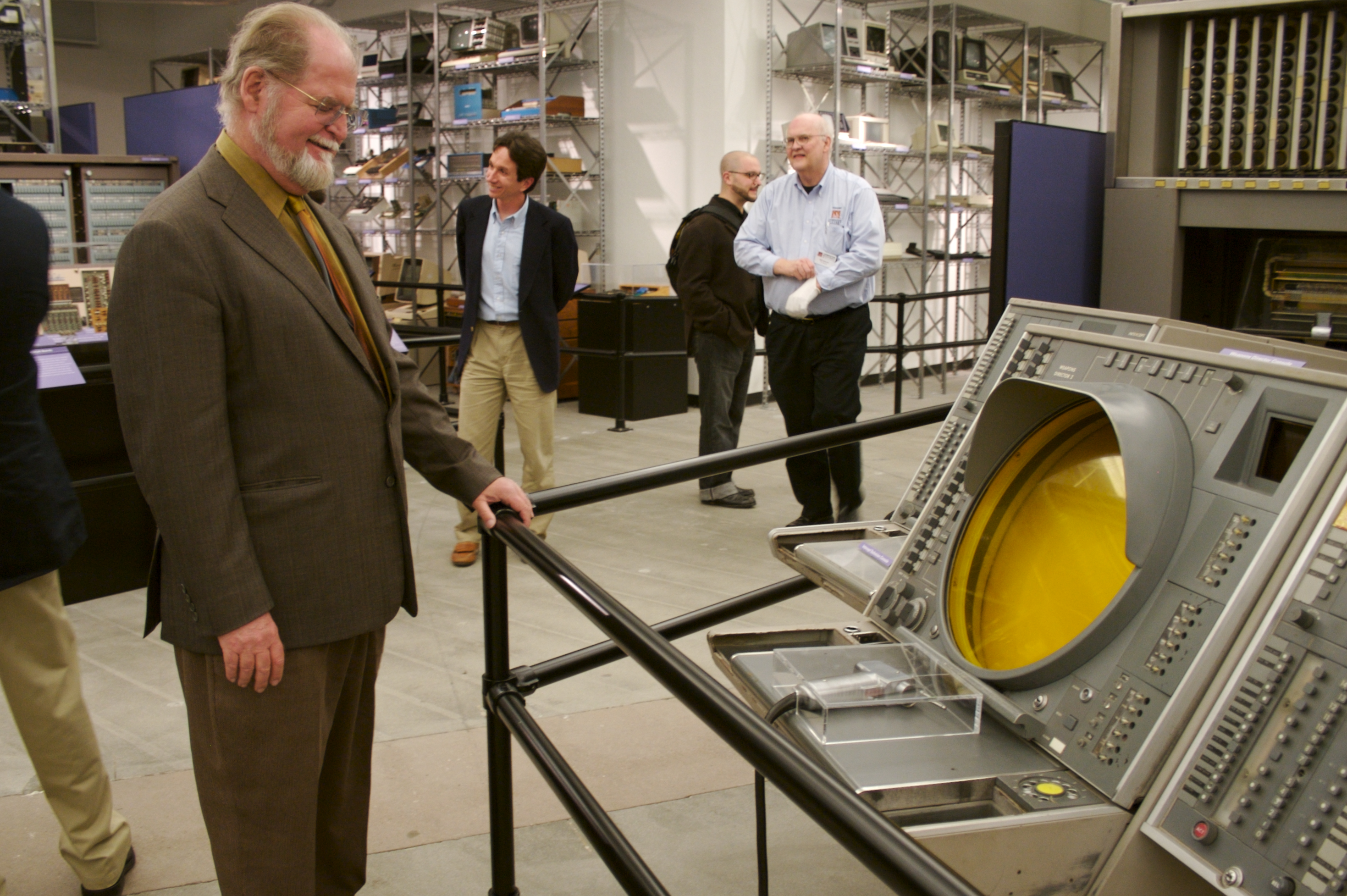
Niven at the Computer History Museum in Mountain View, California, 2007

Laurence van Cott Niven (/ˈnɪvən/; born April 30, 1938) is an American science fiction writer. His 1970 novel Ringworld won the Hugo, Locus, Ditmar, and Nebula awards. With Jerry Pournelle he wrote The Mote in God's Eye (1974) and Lucifer's Hammer (1977). The Science Fiction and Fantasy Writers of America gave him the 2015 Damon Knight Memorial Grand Master Award.

His work is primarily hard science fiction, using grand concepts and theoretical physics. It also often includes elements of detective fiction and adventure stories. His fantasy includes the series The Magic Goes Away, works of rational fantasy dealing with magic as a non-renewable resource.

== Biography ==
Niven was born in Los Angeles. He is a great-grandson of Edward L. Doheny, an oil tycoon who drilled the first successful well in the Los Angeles City Oil Field in 1892, and also was subsequently implicated in the Teapot Dome scandal.

Niven briefly attended the California Institute of Technology and graduated with a Bachelor of Arts in mathematics (with a minor in psychology) from Washburn University in Topeka, Kansas in 1962. He also completed a year of graduate work in mathematics at the University of California, Los Angeles. On September 6, 1969, he married Marilyn Wisowaty, a science fiction and Regency literature fan.

== Work ==
Niven is the author of numerous science fiction short stories and novels, beginning with his 1964 story "The Coldest Place". In this story, the coldest place concerned is the dark side of Mercury, which at the time the story was written was thought to be tidally locked with the Sun (it was found to rotate in a 2:3 resonance after Niven received payment for the story, but before it was published).

Algis Budrys said in 1968 that Niven becoming a top writer despite the New Wave was evidence that "trends are for second-raters". In addition to the Nebula Award in 1970 and the Hugo and Locus awards in 1971 for Ringworld, Niven won the Hugo Award for Best Short Story for "Neutron Star" in 1967. He won the same award in 1972, for "Inconstant Moon", and in 1975 for "The Hole Man". In 1976, he won the Hugo Award for Best Novelette for "The Borderland of Sol".

Niven frequently collaborated with Jerry Pournelle, who wrote in 1987 that he hesitated to buy a new computer to write with because Niven would "buy two exact duplicates of my setup on the theory that the best maintenance policy is a second system". They wrote nine novels together, including The Mote in God's Eye, Lucifer's Hammer and Footfall.

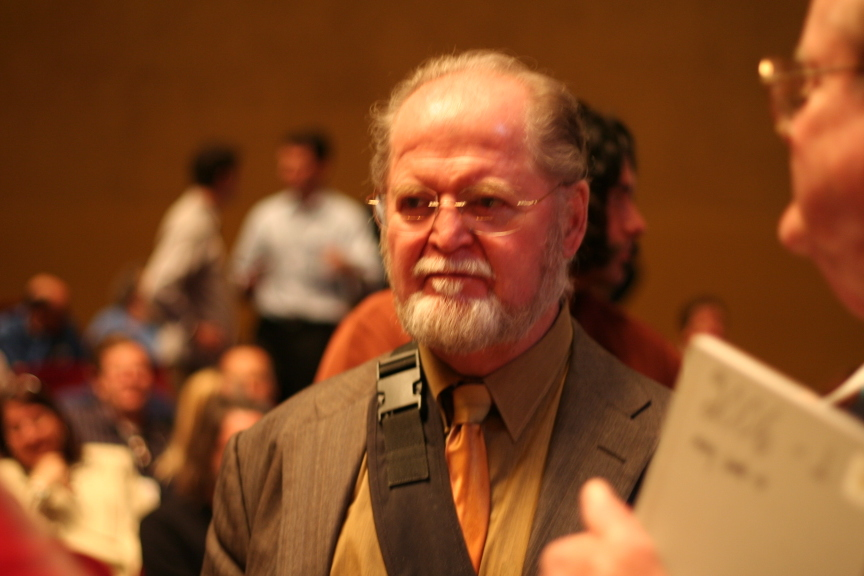
Niven at Stanford University in 2006

Niven has written scripts for two science fiction television series: the original Land of the Lost series and Star Trek: The Animated Series, for which he adapted his early story "The Soft Weapon." For The Outer Limits, his story "Inconstant Moon" was adapted into an episode of the same name by Brad Wright.

Niven has also written for the DC Comics character Green Lantern, including in his stories hard science fiction concepts such as universal entropy and the redshift effect.

Several of his stories predicted the black market in transplant organs ("organlegging").

Many of Niven's stories—sometimes called the Tales of Known Space—take place in his Known Space universe, in which humanity shares the several habitable star systems nearest to the Sun with over a dozen alien species, including the aggressive feline Kzinti and the very intelligent but cowardly Pierson's Puppeteers, which are frequently central characters. The Ringworld series is part of the Tales of Known Space, and Niven has shared the setting with other writers since a 1988 anthology, The Man-Kzin Wars (Baen Books, jointly edited with Jerry Pournelle and Dean Ing). There have been several volumes of short stories and novellas.

Niven has also written a logical fantasy series The Magic Goes Away, which utilizes an exhaustible resource called mana to power a rule-based "technological" magic. The Draco Tavern series of short stories take place in a more light-hearted science fiction universe, and are told from the point of view of the proprietor of an omni-species bar. The whimsical Svetz series consists of a collection of short stories, The Flight of the Horse, and a novel, Rainbow Mars, which involve a nominal time machine sent back to retrieve long-extinct animals, but which travels, in fact, into alternative realities and brings back mythical creatures such as a roc and a unicorn. Much of his writing since the 1970s has been in collaboration, particularly with Jerry Pournelle and Steven Barnes, but also Brenda Cooper and Edward M. Lerner.

One of Niven's best known humorous works is "Man of Steel, Woman of Kleenex", in which he uses real-world physics to underline the difficulties of Superman and a human woman (Lois Lane or Lana Lang) mating.

== Influence ==
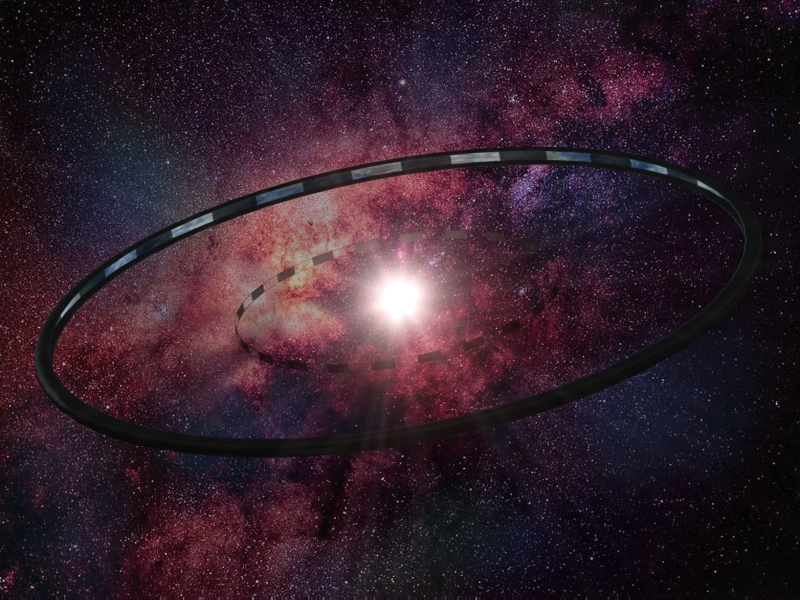
Ringworld

In the Magic: The Gathering trading card game, the card Nevinyrral's Disk uses his name, spelled backwards. This tribute was paid because the game's system where mana from lands is used to power spells was inspired by his book The Magic Goes Away. The card Nevinyrral, Urborg Tyrant was added in Commander Legends, adding Niven's namesake character fully to the game.

== Politics ==
According to author Michael Moorcock, in 1967, Niven, despite being a staunch conservative, voiced opposition to the Vietnam War. However, in 1968 Niven signed an advertisement in Galaxy Science Fiction in support for continued US involvement in the Vietnam War.

Niven was an adviser to Ronald Reagan on the creation of the Strategic Defense Initiative antimissile policy, as part of the Citizens' Advisory Council on National Space Policy—as covered in the BBC documentary Pandora's Box by Adam Curtis.

In 2007, Niven, in conjunction with a think tank of science fiction writers known as SIGMA, founded and led by Arlan Andrews, began advising the U.S. Department of Homeland Security as to future trends affecting terror policy and other topics. Among those topics was reducing costs for hospitals, to which Niven offered the solution to spread rumors in Latino communities that organs were being harvested illegally in hospitals.

== Niven's laws ==
Larry Niven is also known in science fiction fandom for "Niven's Law": "There is no cause so right that one cannot find a fool following it." Over the course of his career Niven has added to this first law a list of Niven's Laws which he describes as "how the Universe works" as far as he can tell.
