= Neptune in fiction =

Depictions of the planet

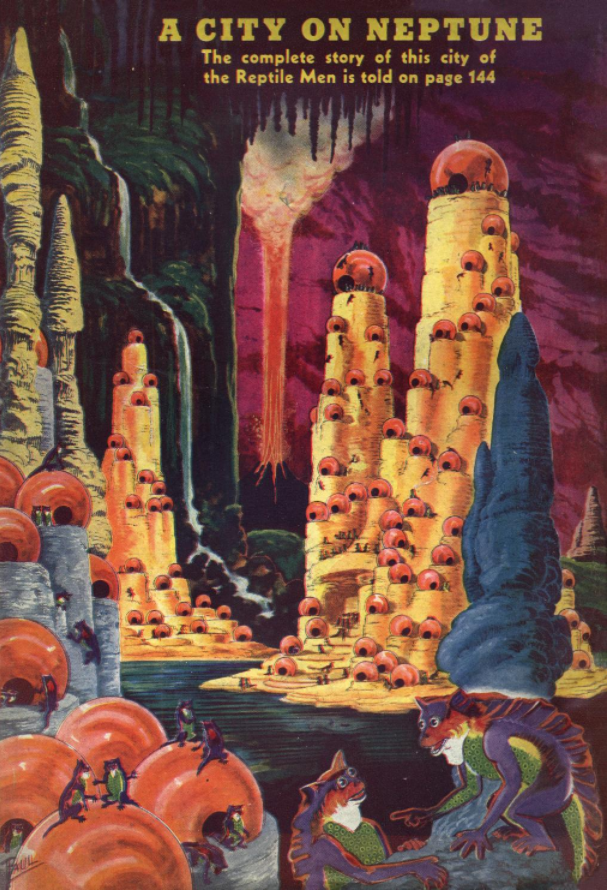
"A City on Neptune" by Frank R. Paul. Back cover of Amazing Stories, March 1941.

Neptune has appeared in fiction since shortly after its 1846 discovery, albeit infrequently. It initially made appearances indirectly—through its inhabitants, for example—rather than as a setting. The earliest stories set on Neptune itself portrayed it as a rocky planet rather than as having its actual gaseous composition; later works rectified this error. Extraterrestrial life on Neptune is uncommon in fiction, though the exceptions have ranged from humanoids to gaseous lifeforms. Neptune's largest moon Triton has also appeared in fiction, especially in the late 20th century onwards.

== Neptune ==
Neptune was discovered in 1846 and has made only occasional appearances in fiction since then; in the catalogue of early science fiction works compiled by E. F. Bleiler and Richard Bleiler in the reference works Science-Fiction: The Early Years from 1990 and Science-Fiction: The Gernsback Years from 1998, Neptune appears in 9 (out of 2,475) and 18 (out of 1,835) works respectively, compared to 194 for Mars in fiction and 131 for Venus in fiction in The Gernsback Years alone. Brian Ash writes in The Visual Encyclopedia of Science Fiction that "Neptune has been largely overlooked in the genre", and Richard L. McKinney describes it as "unexplored territory" in The Greenwood Encyclopedia of Science Fiction and Fantasy. The Encyclopedia of Science Fiction attributes this in part to its relatively late date of discovery, Brian Stableford writes in Science Fact and Science Fiction: An Encyclopedia that its remote location was a significant factor, and science fiction scholar Gary Westfahl posits in Science Fiction Literature through History: An Encyclopedia that the presumed-harsh environmental conditions of the planet made it unappealing for writers to use it as a setting.

=== Early depictions ===
The first time Neptune was mentioned in a work of fiction—then called "Leverrier's planet" after astronomer Urbain Le Verrier whose orbital calculations led to the planet's discovery—was in the 1848 novel The Triumphs of Woman by Charles Rowcroft, in which an inhabitant of the planet visits Earth. Neptune was usually omitted in the subgenre of works visiting multiple locations in the Solar System that appeared in this time, though it did make some indirect appearances in works not otherwise set there. Supernatural communication with its inhabitants appears in Marie Corelli's 1892 novel The Soul of Lilith. In the 1897 short story "The Star" by H. G. Wells, an impact event causes Neptune to turn into a star and puts it on a collision course with Earth. In Robert William Cole's 1900 novel The Struggle for Empire: A Story of the Year 2236, described by science fiction scholar E. F. Bleiler as the first space opera and by Westfahl as the first appearance of a galactic empire, the vicinity of Neptune is the site of a battle between the British Empire that has come to rule the Solar System and the forces of a rival empire centered on Sirius.

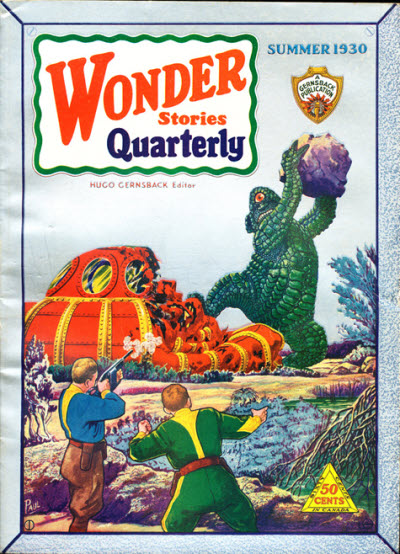
Henrik Dahl Juve's "The Monsters of Neptune" illustrated by Frank R. Paul on the cover of Wonder Stories Quarterly, Summer 1930

Early works incorrectly depicted Neptune as a solid planet, and several stories thus include human expeditions to its surface. The earliest story in which Neptune itself directly appears as a setting is the 1929 short story "A Baby on Neptune" by Clare Winger Harris and Miles J. Breuer; the planet is covered in ice. It also appears in the 1930 short story "The Monsters of Neptune" by Henrik Dahl Juve, this time with a tropical climate. Alien life on Neptune, while uncommon, appears in some stories; "A Baby on Neptune" features gaseous lifeforms and "The Monsters of Neptune" grotesque creatures, while Neptune in the 1932 novel The Vanguard to Neptune by J. M. Walsh is populated by humanoids. In the 1930 short story "The Universe Wreckers" by Edmond Hamilton, the former inhabitants of Neptune have left the planet for its moon Triton due to environmental changes. The concept of Neptune turning into a star from "The Star" was reused in the 1932 short story "Raiders of the Universes" by Donald Wandrei, although in this case it then proceeds to leave the Solar System rather than heading towards its center.

The most significant appearance of Neptune in fiction in this era is in the 1930 novel Last and First Men by Olaf Stapledon, which outlines the future history of humanity through several billions of years and various sequential species from the First Men to the Eighteenth. In the story, Neptune becomes humanity's refuge in the far future when the Sun expands. This plot point later reappears in the 1934 short story "Twilight" by John W. Campbell and its 1935 sequel "Night". After this, however, says Stableford, Neptune "retreated into obscurity again as pulp science fiction grew more sophisticated".

=== Later depictions ===
[Gardner Dozois] didn't mind that there were elephants on Neptune, or that they breathed oxygen, or that they could speak English, or that they could forage and find food—but it bothered the hell out of him that I'd given Neptune a solid surface when everyone knows it's a gas giant, so I had to insert a sentence explaining that.

— Mike Resnick, on selling the 2002 short story "The Elephants on Neptune" to Asimov's Science Fiction

Once more became known about Neptune through advances in planetary science, fiction writers began portraying it more accurately as a gaseous planet. Thus Alexei Panshin's 1969 short story "One Sunday in Neptune" depicts a voyage into Neptune's atmosphere and Alex Irvine's 2003 short story "Shepherded by Galatea" features resource extraction in the atmosphere. In the 1969 novel Macroscope by Piers Anthony, Neptune is converted to a world ship, and in the 1997 film Event Horizon the titular spacecraft is adrift in Neptunian orbit. The planet also appears in Jack Williamson's 1985 short story "At the Human Limit", Gregory Feeley's 1986 short story "Neptune's Reach", the adventures of comic book superhero Superman, the television series Doctor Who, and the video game Descent.

== Triton ==
Neptune's largest moon Triton was discovered less than a month after the planet. A few works in the 1930s depicted humans going to Triton, looking for minerals in Roman Frederick Starzl's 1932 short story "The Power Satellite" and a permanent home in John R. Pierce's 1930 short story "The Relics from the Earth". In the 1950s, the moon appeared in Margaret St. Clair's 1950 short story "The Pillows" and Alfred Bester's 1956 novel The Stars My Destination—albeit called "Lassell" in the latter, after its discoverer William Lassell. In the late 20th century it started receiving more attention from science fiction writers than Neptune itself. The main such work is Samuel R. Delany's 1976 novel Triton (a.k.a. Trouble on Triton: An Ambiguous Heterotopia) which depicts future societies living there. Gordon Eklund's 1989 novel A Thunder on Neptune is partially set on Triton and features an exobiological expedition to Neptune. In the 1994 novel Neptune Crossing by Jeffrey Carver, an alien on Triton helps humanity avert an impact event.

== See also ==
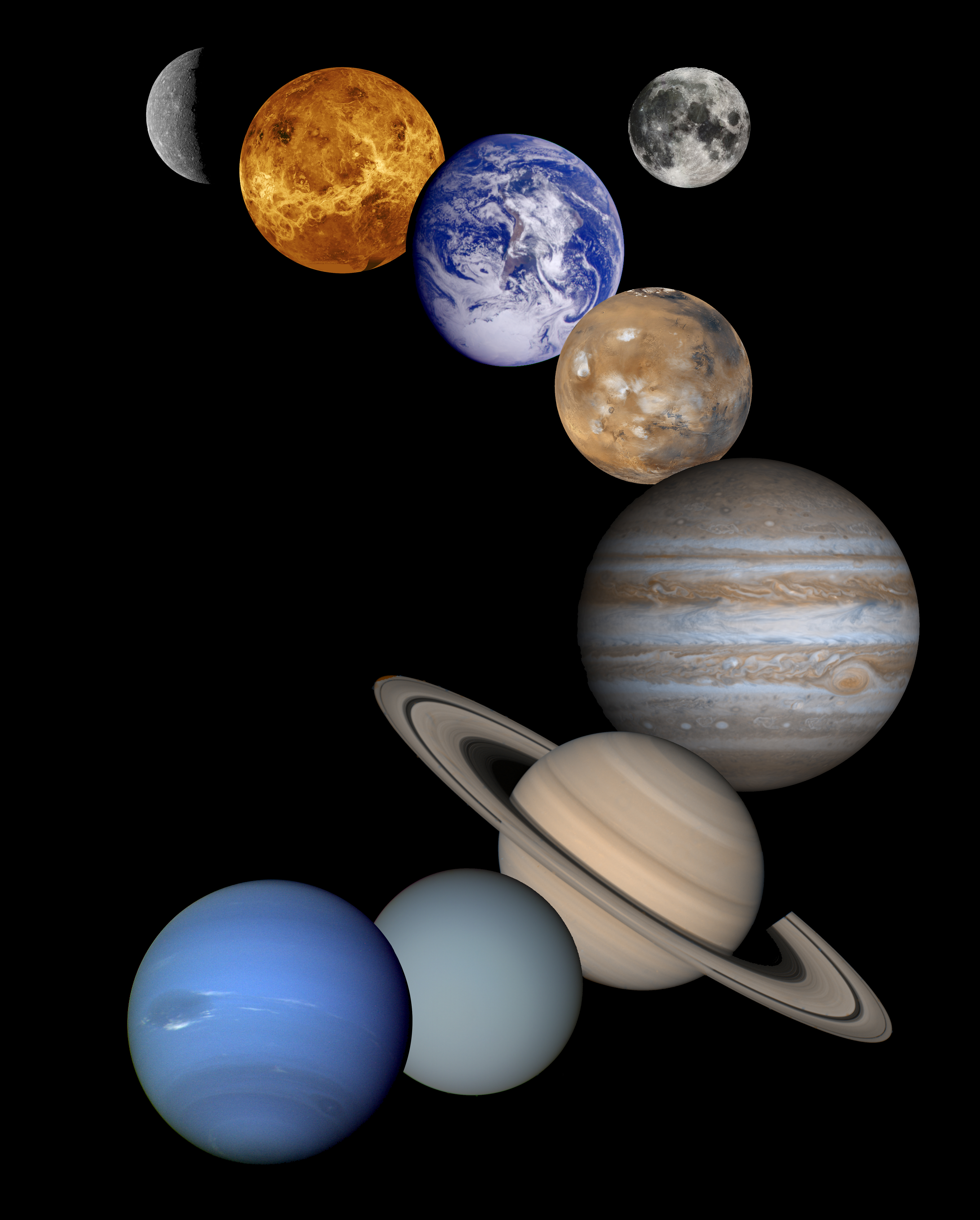
Clicking on a planet leads to the article about its depiction in fiction.

- Solar System in fiction
- Sun in fiction
