= Encyclopedia of Science Fiction =

Encyclopedia of Science Fiction or Science Fiction Encyclopedia may refer to:

- The Encyclopedia of Science Fiction and Fantasy (first volume published in 1974), edited by Donald H. Tuck
- The Visual Encyclopedia of Science Fiction (published 1977), edited by Brian Ash
- The Encyclopedia of Science Fiction (first edition published 1979; now online), edited by Peter Nicholls and John Clute
- Encyclopedia of Science Fiction (1978 book), with consultant editor Robert Holdstock
- The Greenwood Encyclopedia of Science Fiction and Fantasy (2005), edited by Gary Westfahl
- Science Fact and Science Fiction: An Encyclopedia (2006), by Brian Stableford
- Science Fiction Literature through History: An Encyclopedia (2021), by Gary Westfahl
