= Pluto in fiction =

Depictions of the dwarf planet

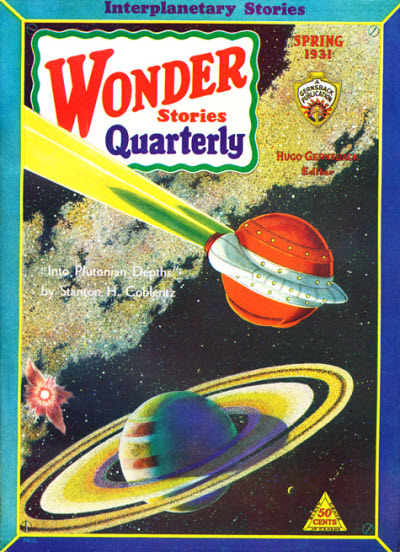
Cover of Wonder Stories Quarterly, Spring 1931, featuring Stanton A. Coblentz's Into Plutonian Depths

Pluto has appeared in fiction as a setting since shortly after its 1930 discovery, albeit infrequently. It was initially comparatively popular as it was newly discovered and thought to be the outermost object of the Solar System and made more fictional appearances than either Uranus or Neptune, though still far fewer than other planets. Alien life, sometimes intelligent life and occasionally an entire ecosphere, is a common motif in fictional depictions of Pluto. Human settlement appears only sporadically, but it is often either the starting or finishing point for a tour of the Solar System. It has variously been depicted as an originally extrasolar planet, the remnants of a destroyed planet, or entirely artificial. Its moon Charon has also appeared in a handful of works.

== Pluto ==
Pluto was discovered by Clyde Tombaugh in 1930 and has made comparatively sporadic appearances in fiction since then; in the catalogue of early science fiction works compiled by E. F. Bleiler and Richard Bleiler in the 1998 reference work Science-Fiction: The Gernsback Years, Pluto only appears in 21 (out of 1,835) works, compared to 194 for Mars and 131 for Venus. Richard L. McKinney describes it as "unexplored territory" in The Greenwood Encyclopedia of Science Fiction and Fantasy, and science fiction scholar Gary Westfahl posits that the presumed-harsh environmental conditions of the dwarf planet made it unappealing for writers to use it as a setting. McKinney nevertheless writes that it has made more appearances than one might expect, and Brian Stableford comments in The Dictionary of Science Fiction Places that Pluto has made both more frequent and more varied appearances than Uranus in fiction or Neptune in fiction, whose corresponding figures from The Gernsback Years are 9 and 18, respectively. Stableford attributes this to Pluto (at the time) being considered the outermost planet of the Solar System, as does The Encyclopedia of Science Fiction. Stableford adds in Science Fact and Science Fiction: An Encyclopedia that Pluto's popularity during the pulp era of science fiction was increased by its then-recent discovery, and Westfahl writes that its similarity to Earth in terms of size and composition contributed to a relatively common portrayal as an abode of life.

=== Early depictions ===
Even before Pluto's discovery, a planet beyond the orbit of Neptune appeared in Donald W. Horner's 1912 novel Their Winged Destiny. The earliest story featuring Pluto was likely the satirical 1931 novel Into Plutonian Depths by Stanton A. Coblentz, which depicts an advanced Plutonian civilization. Another candidate for the first story is H. P. Lovecraft's 1931 short story "The Whisperer in Darkness". Other early depictions of Pluto are found in the 1935 short story "The Red Peri" by Stanley G. Weinbaum, where it houses a base for space pirates; the 1936 short story "En Route to Pluto" by Wallace West, which portrays the first expedition there; and the 1936 novel The Cometeers in Jack Williamson's Legion of Space series.

=== Life on Pluto ===
Alien life on Pluto, sometimes including intelligent life, is a common motif in fiction. Besides the humanoid civilization in Into Plutonian Depths, it is home to more exotic mist creatures and crystal lifeforms in "En Route to Pluto" and "The Red Peri", respectively. Aliens from elsewhere have settled Pluto in the 1950 novel First Lensman by E. E. Smith, and use it as a base in Robert A. Heinlein's 1958 novel Have Space Suit—Will Travel. The 1970 novel World's Fair 1992 by Robert Silverberg portrays an astrobiological expedition to Pluto, and a complex planetary ecosphere on Pluto is depicted in—among other stories—the 1988 novel Iceborn (a.k.a. Proserpina's Daughter) by Gregory Benford and Paul A. Carter. Iceborn is also included in a list of works with relatively plausible depictions of Plutonian lifeforms compiled by astronomer Andrew Fraknoi, alongside others such as Robert Silverberg's 1985 short story "Sunrise on Pluto" and Stephen Baxter's 1995 short story "Gossamer".

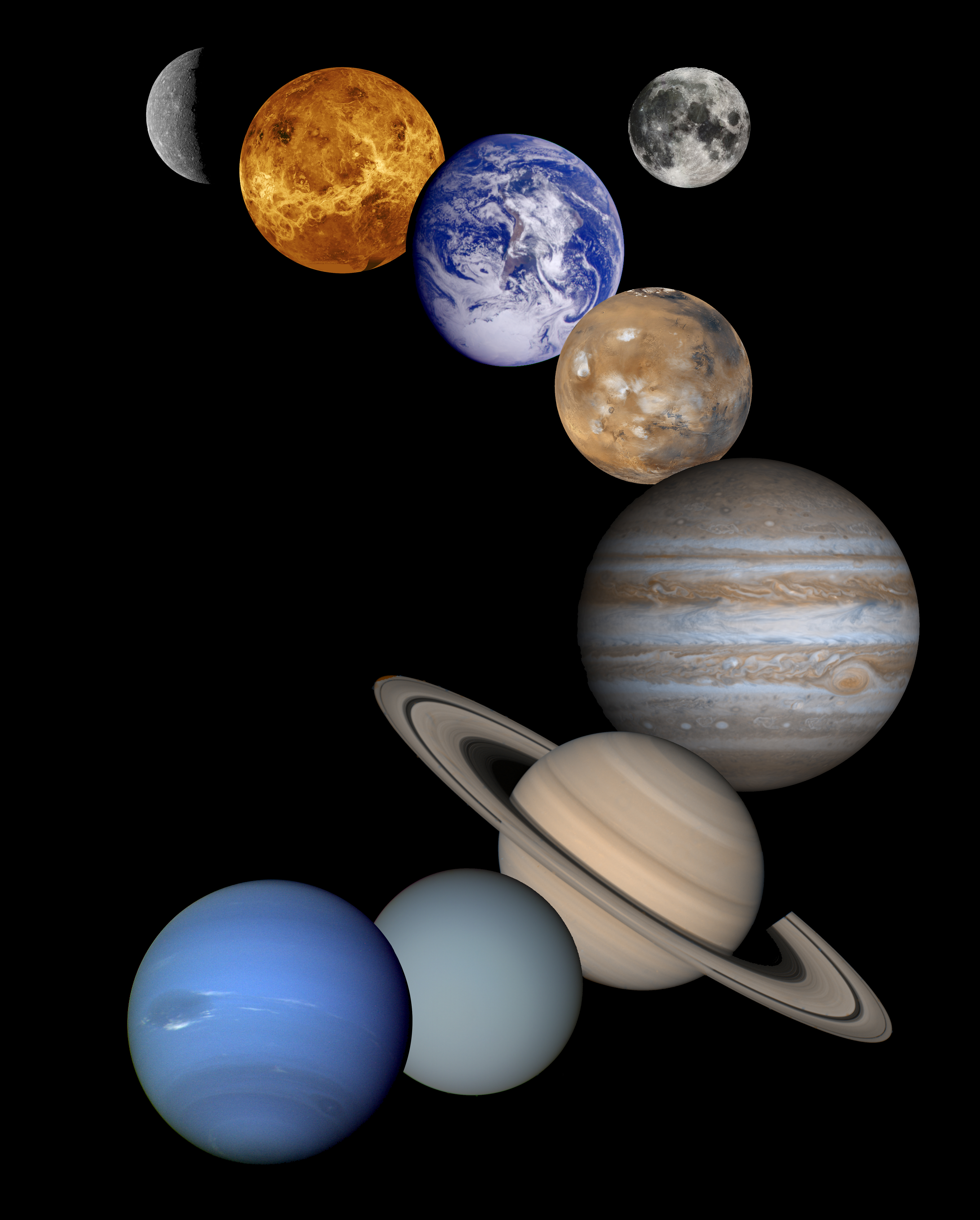
Pluto occasionally appears as the starting or finishing point of tours of the Solar System. Clicking on a planet leads to the article about its depiction in fiction.

Portrayals of human life on Pluto are less common, though Pluto is terraformed in the 1944 short story "Circle of Confusion" by George O. Smith and colonized in the 1958 novel Man of Earth by Algis Budrys. A more common approach is using it as a destination for characters to reach, as in Wilson Tucker's 1960 novel To the Tombaugh Station. Sometimes this is as the final stop in a tour of the Solar System, as in Donald A. Wollheim's 1959 novel The Secret of the Ninth Planet; other times Pluto is the starting point for such a tour, as in Kim Stanley Robinson's 1985 novel The Memory of Whiteness. It also appears as the site of a research station in Heinlein's 1959 novel Starship Troopers, and an astronaut is stranded on Pluto in the 1968 short story "Wait It Out" by Larry Niven.

=== Origin ===
Various origins for Pluto have been proposed in fiction. In the 1934 short story "The Rape of the Solar System" by Leslie F. Stone, it is a remnant of the former fifth planet Bodia, the destruction of which also created the asteroid belt. In The Secret of the Ninth Planet, Pluto originally came from a different solar system, and in the 1973 short story "Construction Shack" by Clifford D. Simak, it is found to be artificial. In the 1975 short story "The Borderland of Sol" by Larry Niven, Pluto is a former moon of Neptune.

=== Later depictions ===
The 1984 novel Icehenge by Kim Stanley Robinson features an artefact resembling Stonehenge bearing Sanskrit text being discovered on Pluto, and revolves around the investigation into its origin. Pluto is the site of cryonic storage in Charles Sheffield's 1997 novel Tomorrow and Tomorrow, and sees a mysterious increase in temperature in Gregory Benford's 2005 novel The Sunborn. Pluto was reclassified from planet to dwarf planet in 2006, a subject which was later explored in the 2011 novel Young Tales of the Old Cosmos by Rhys Hughes. It also makes appearances in the television series Doctor Who and various comic books.

== Charon ==
Pluto's moon Charon was discovered in 1978 and appears as a setting in the 1990 novels Take Back Plenty by Colin Greenland and The Ring of Charon by Roger MacBride Allen, as well as their respective sequels. In the 1987 novel Charon's Ark by Rick Gauger, it is revealed that Charon is an alien world ship carrying prehistoric lifeforms from Earth. In the 2003 short story "The Trellis" by Larry Niven and Brenda Cooper, Charon is attached to Pluto by massive strands of plant matter. In the video game series Mass Effect, Charon is a relay station for interstellar travel.

== See also ==
- Solar System in fiction
