= Asteroids in fiction =

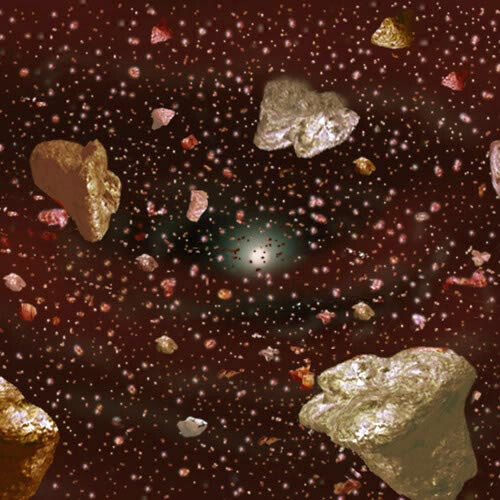
Artist's conception of a dense asteroid field

Asteroids have appeared in fiction since at least the late 1800s, (Note: The earliest example listed in the catalogue of early science fiction works compiled by E. F. Bleiler and Richard Bleiler in the 1990 reference work Science-Fiction: The Early Years is the anonymously published 1886 story Man Abroad: A Yarn of Some Other Century.) the first one—Ceres—having been discovered in 1801. They were initially only used infrequently as writers preferred the planets as settings. The once-popular Phaëton hypothesis, which states that the asteroid belt consists of the remnants of the former fifth planet that existed in an orbit between Mars and Jupiter before somehow being destroyed, has been a recurring theme with various explanations for the planet's destruction proposed. This hypothetical former planet is in science fiction often called "Bodia" in reference to Johann Elert Bode, for whom the since-discredited Titius–Bode law that predicts the planet's existence is named.

By the early 1900s, the asteroids started making more regular appearances. The asteroid field has often been depicted as having asteroids so close together as to impede travel, though this became less common later in the century as writers started portraying a more realistic density. Because the asteroids are so small, they are usually not depicted as inhabited—though in some works they are nevertheless habitable. In other works they are made so by human activity, be it terraforming or hollowing out to create habitats on the inside. The latter concept has also been used for turning asteroids into spacecraft. Human activity in the asteroid belt has featured frequently since the pulp era of science fiction, particularly in the form of asteroid mining. Space piracy also debuted as a theme around the same time. In works where the asteroid belt is settled by humans, it is often conceptually similar to the Wild West.

The threat of impact events by asteroids has been a recurring theme. It received successive boosts in popularity following the 1980 publication of the Alvarez hypothesis about the extinction of the dinosaurs and the 1994 impact of Comet Shoemaker–Levy 9 on Jupiter. Many stories involve attempts to alter asteroid trajectories to avert such collisions, while in some stories they are instead caused intentionally.

== Remnants of a planet ==
How might it be if Ceres and Pallas were just a pair of fragments, or portions of a once greater planet which at one time occupied its proper place between Mars and Jupiter, and was in size more analogous to the other planets, and perhaps millions of years ago, had, either through the impact of a comet, or from an internal explosion, burst into pieces?

— Letter from Heinrich Olbers to William Herschel, May 17, 1802

The first asteroid—Ceres—was discovered by Giuseppe Piazzi in 1801. For the rest of that century, however, asteroids rarely appeared in fiction—writers preferring the planets as settings. When German astronomer Heinrich Olbers discovered a second asteroid—Pallas—in the same orbit in 1802, he theorized that these objects were remnants of a planet predicted by the Titius–Bode law to exist between Mars and Jupiter that had somehow been destroyed. This became a popular explanation for the existence of the asteroid belt, though it has since been superseded by the notion that the material never coalesced into a planet in the first place. In astronomy, this hypothetical former fifth planet is known as Phaëton; in science fiction, it is often called "Bodia" after Johann Elert Bode. An early science fiction work that mentions this explanation for the origin of the asteroids is Robert Cromie's 1895 novel The Crack of Doom, which describes the release of energy stored in atomic nuclei a few thousand years ago as the culprit.

By the pulp era of science fiction, Bodia was a recurring theme. In these stories it is typically similar to Earth and inhabited by humans, often advanced humans and occasionally the ancestors of humans on Earth. Interplanetary warfare with Mars causes the destruction of Bodia—and indirectly, the end of civilization on Mars—in Harl Vincent's 1930 short story "Before the Asteroids". An internal disaster resulting in the explosion of the planetary core is responsible in John Francis Kalland's 1932 short story "The Sages of Eros". In Leslie F. Stone's 1934 short story "The Rape of the Solar System", war with Mars over the colonization of then-uninhabited Earth results both in the partial destruction of Bodia, thus creating the asteroids, and the displacement of the largest fragment to a much wider orbit to create Pluto, while the settlers on Earth eventually become humanity.

Following the invention of the atomic bomb in 1945, stories of this planetary destruction became increasingly common, encouraged by the advent of a plausible-seeming means of disintegration. Robert A. Heinlein's 1948 novel Space Cadet thus states that the fifth planet was destroyed as a result of nuclear war, and in Ray Bradbury's 1948 short story "Asleep in Armageddon" (a.k.a. "Perchance to Dream"), the ghosts of the former warring factions infect the mind of an astronaut stranded on an asteroid. Several works of the 1950s reused the idea to warn of the dangers of nuclear weapons, including Lord Dunsany's 1954 Joseph Jorkens short story "The Gods of Clay" and James Blish's 1957 novel The Frozen Year (a.k.a. Fallen Star). In Jack Williamson's 1942–1951 Seetee series an antimatter explosion is to blame, and in Theodore Cogswell's 1955 short story "Test Area", the destruction results from a nuclear test conducted by the inhabitants of Mars, while in Heinlein's 1951 novel Between Planets the technology that caused the destruction has been lost to time. The planet's destruction by Martians is also mentioned in Heinlein's 1961 novel Stranger in a Strange Land, and implied to have been caused using supernatural powers. The 1977 novel Inherit the Stars, the first in James P. Hogan's Giants series, revisits the theme of the fifth planet—here called "Minerva"—being destroyed by nuclear war.

In Raymond Z. Gallun's 1950 short story "A Step Farther Out", valuables from the destroyed civilization are recovered, and in Harry Harrison's 1969 novel Plague Ship, an ancient virus is found in the asteroid remnants. Paul Preuss's 1985 short story "Small Bodies", where fossils are found on an asteroid, is a late example of the destroyed planet theme; it has otherwise largely been relegated to deliberately retro works such as the 1989 tabletop role-playing game Space: 1889. A variation on the theme appears in Clifford D. Simak's 1973 short story "Construction Shack", where the asteroids are leftover material originally intended for the construction of a fifth planet.

== Navigational hazard ==
Asteroids started making more frequent appearances in fiction in the early 1900s, and these works tended to depict the asteroid belt as a region that must be navigated carefully lest one's spaceship should collide with one of the asteroids. The space opera subgenre in particular often features this motif. In Isaac Asimov's 1939 short story "Marooned off Vesta", a group of astronauts run into this danger, and in Williamson's 1949 novel Seetee Shock, a region of space is virtually impassable for this reason. The problem is circumvented in Mark Clifton's 1960 novel Eight Keys to Eden by exploiting the third dimension of space, since the asteroids are mostly located in the plane of the ecliptic.

Later works mostly recognize that the individual asteroids are very far apart: the average distance between them is comparable to the Earth–Moon distance. Accordingly, they pose little danger to spacecraft, though this need not necessarily be the case in asteroid fields outside of our Solar System. Nevertheless, the idea of a thick asteroid field that poses constant danger to any spaceship within it recurs in the 1979 video game Asteroids, and close-quarter dogfights between spacecraft among asteroids appear in the 1980 Star Wars film The Empire Strikes Back and the 1995–1996 television series Space: Above and Beyond. A densely packed extrasolar asteroid field in the Alpha Centauri system also appears in the 1981 episode "The Golden Man" of the television series Buck Rogers in the 25th Century. Piers Anthony's 1984 novel Mercenary goes so far in its adaptation of the 1241 Mongol invasion of Hungary to the asteroid belt that it treats space as two-dimensional and constrains movement accordingly.

== Native life ==
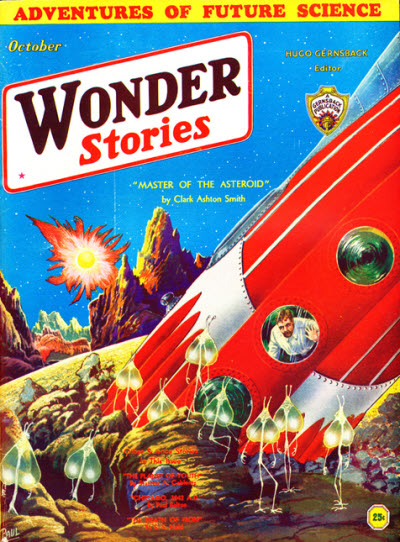
Clark Ashton Smith's "Master of the Asteroid" illustrated by Frank R. Paul on the cover of Wonder Stories, October 1932

Alien life on asteroids appears only rarely in fiction, owing to their small size. An early example is found in Konstantin Tsiolkovsky's 1896 short work "On Vesta", where the lifeforms are intelligent and technologically advanced. Humans stranded on an asteroid encounter hostile aliens in Clark Ashton Smith's 1932 short story "Master of the Asteroid" and Edmond Hamilton's 1933 short story "The Horror on the Asteroid". The titular reptilian of Eden Phillpotts's 1938 novel Saurus comes to Earth from an asteroid as an egg before hatching, and an asteroid is likewise the homeworld of the title character in Antoine de Saint-Exupéry's 1943 novel The Little Prince. Alien plant life on an asteroid turns it not only habitable but paradisiacal in Poul Anderson's 1952 short story "Garden in the Void", and the inhabitants of an asteroid in Philip K. Dick's 1953 satire "Piper in the Woods" persuade human visitors that being a plant is preferable to being human, while a silicon-based lifeform from an asteroid appears in Asimov's 1955 short story "The Talking Stone". In Fredric Brown's 1957 fix-up novel Rogue in Space, an asteroid is itself alive. The notion that asteroids might harbour microbial life, possibly even deadly pathogens that could be transferred to Earth either directly by impacting the planet or indirectly via astronauts visiting the asteroid, also surfaces occasionally.

== Human presence ==
A new concept was introduced in the pulp era of science fiction: asteroid mining. This quickly became the most popular fiction use for the asteroids, and the asteroid belt was often portrayed as the setting of a space version of the Klondike or California gold rush in works like Simak's 1932 short story "The Asteroid of Gold", Stanton A. Coblentz's 1935 short story "The Golden Planetoid", and Malcolm Jameson's 1940 short story "Prospectors of Space". Along with this outer-space analogy of the Western genre came the introduction of space piracy to the asteroids in works like Moore Raymond's 1934 short story "Scouts of Space" and Royal W. Heckman's 1938 short story "Asteroid Pirates", as well as stories of stranded astronauts as in John Wyndham's 1933 short story "Exiles on Asperus" and the above-mentioned "Master of the Asteroid" and "Marooned off Vesta". These themes continued to appear in the decades that followed: Heinlein's 1952 novel The Rolling Stones portrays a community of asteroid miners, Asimov's 1953 novel Lucky Starr and the Pirates of the Asteroids features space pirates, and Arthur C. Clarke's 1960 short story "Summertime on Icarus" depicts an astronaut stranded on the asteroid Icarus as it makes a close approach to the Sun.

The prospect of colonizing the asteroids was limited by their small size, though this did not stop some works such as the 1959–1964 science fiction anthology series The Twilight Zone from portraying asteroids with breathable atmospheres and Earth-level gravity. Somewhat more realistic portrayals of human-habitable asteroids involve terraforming, as in Paul Ernst's 1931 short story "The Planetoid of Peril" and Jack Vance's 1947 short story "I'll Build Your Dream Castle", or hollowing them out to create space stations or habitats, as in Heinlein's 1939 short story "Misfit". In "I'll Build Your Dream Castle", the terraformed asteroids are sold as luxury real estate, while in Charles Platt's 1967 novel Garbage World, a terraforming effort gone wrong results in an asteroid being used as a dumping place for the Solar System's garbage.

The concept of hollowing out asteroids has also extended to turning them into large spacecraft, as in Murray Leinster's 1960 novel The Wailing Asteroid. In Frederik Pohl's 1977 novel Gateway and its sequels, an asteroid that orbits at an unusual ninety-degree angle to the ecliptic turns out to have been modified in this way by aliens long ago, while in George Zebrowski's 1979 novel Macrolife humanity converts a large number of asteroids into spacecraft for interstellar travel. Another alien-modified asteroid appears in Greg Bear's 1985 novel Eon, and in Pamela Sargent's 1983 novel Earthseed an asteroidal generation ship is used for settling the cosmos. Hollowed-out asteroids used as prisons in interstellar space appear in Zebrowski's 1998 novel Brute Orbits, and the asteroid Sidonia is converted into another generation ship in the 2014–2015 anime series Knights of Sidonia.

Settlement in the asteroid belt is in fiction often associated with a fiercely-independent, libertarian-minded, frontier mentality akin to that of the Old West. Anderson's 1970 fix-up novel Tales of the Flying Mountains recounts the history of such a society and the development of its particular culture, in Katherine MacLean's 1975 short story "The Gambling Hell and the Sinful Girl" the asteroids are settled by "outcasts from earth", and Larry Niven's stories of Known Space, such as the 1975 short story collection Tales of Known Space, depict a community of hardened asteroid-miners known as "Belters". John Varley's 1974–1986 Eight Worlds series transposes this motif from the asteroid belt to the remote Oort cloud at the outer edge of the Solar System. In Charles Sheffield's 1995 novel The Ganymede Club, war breaks out over trade disputes, and in the Asteroid Wars subseries of Ben Bova's Grand Tour series, starting with the 2001 novel The Precipice, different factions compete for control of the resources in the asteroid belt, while Chris Bunch's 2002 novel Star Risk, Ltd revisits the older trope of asteroid miners fighting against space pirates. Kim Stanley Robinson's 2012 novel 2312, by contrast, depicts asteroids adapted for human habitation as an integrated part of a thoroughly colonized Solar System. Astrophysicist Elizabeth Stanway writes that while the portrayal of the inhabitants of the asteroid belt as independent-minded remains common in works such as James S. A. Corey's (joint pseudonym of Daniel Abraham and Ty Franck) 2011–2021 novel series The Expanse and its 2015–2022 television adaptation, there has also emerged a portrayal of the region as dominated by corporate interests as in the 2017 Doctor Who episode "Oxygen". Colonized asteroids also appear in games such as the Warhammer 40,000 franchise and the 2009 tabletop role-playing game Eclipse Phase.

Resource extraction from asteroids has remained a common theme in science fiction, serving many different purposes both in space and on Earth. Besides being sources of valuable materials such as precious metals to be sold for profit, asteroids may be repurposed as raw material for space construction projects, and certain compounds such as ice may be used for terraforming. Other compounds may be used on-site for chemical industry purposes, as rocket fuel, or to set up a controlled ecological life-support system. In Fred Hoyle's 1967 short story "Element 79", large quantities of asteroidal gold disrupt the global economy, a topic earlier broached by French science fiction author Jules Verne's posthumously-published 1908 novel The Chase of the Golden Meteor. In Robinson's 1992 novel Red Mars, material from the asteroid belt is used to construct a space elevator.

== Impact events ==
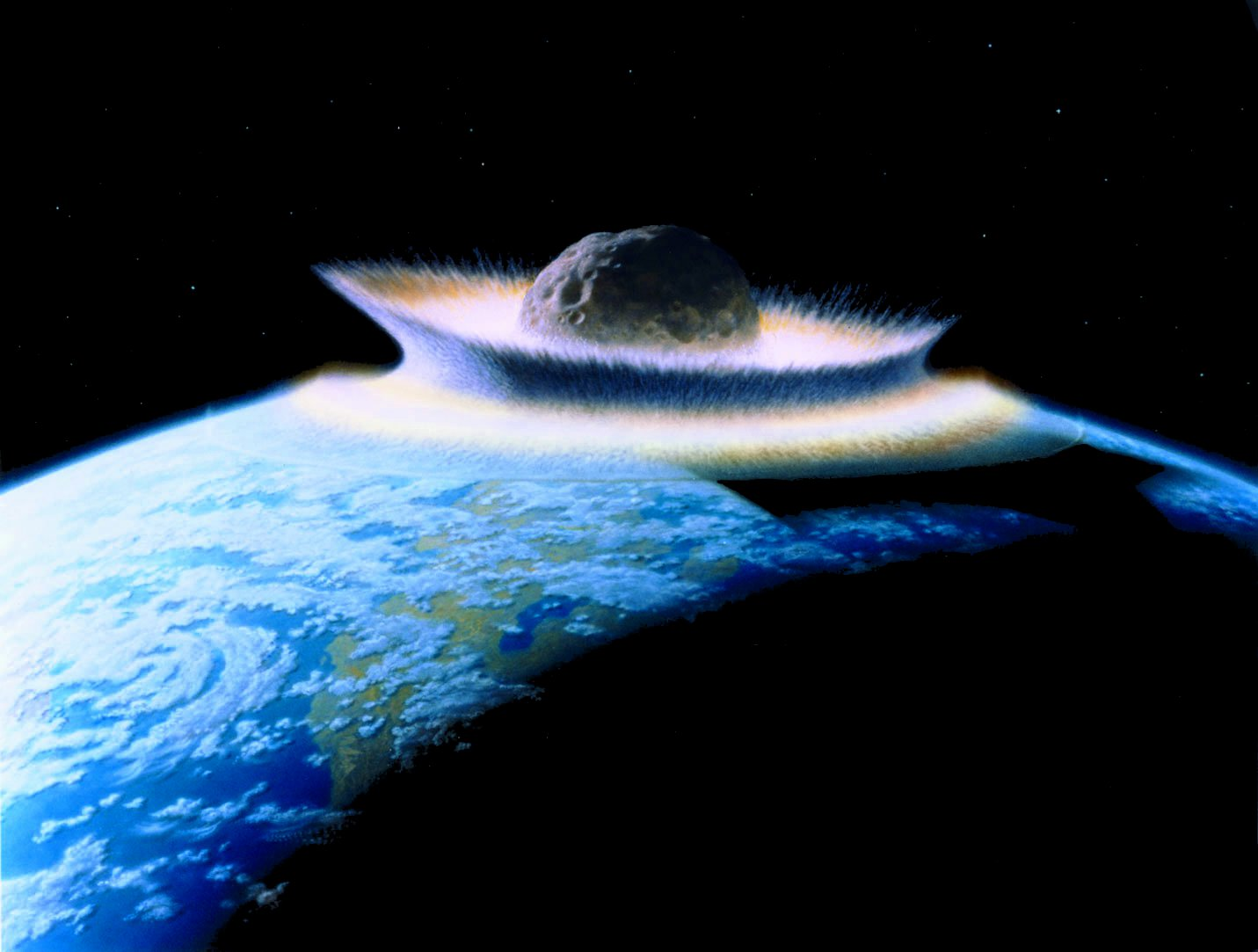
Artist's depiction of an apocalyptic impact event

The threat of asteroidal impact events is a recurring theme. The earliest fictional example, according to science fiction scholar Gary Westfahl, is arguably George Allan England's 1912–1913 serial Darkness and Dawn, a post-apocalyptic story where the exact cause of destruction is never specified but there is a crater hundreds of miles wide and deep in the former Midwestern United States. In the 1916–1917 serial "The Moonmaker" by Arthur Cheney Train and Robert W. Wood, an errant asteroid is diverted to enter Earth orbit as an additional natural satellite instead of striking the Earth, a plot point that recurs in Isaac R. Nathanson's 1930 short story "The Falling Planetoid". In Walter Kateley's 1930 short story "The World of a Hundred Men", a record of an inhabited asteroid's history leading up to its collision with Earth is found underneath Meteor Crater in Arizona.

The asteroid impact motif continued to appear following World War II, at a time when fear of sudden cataclysmic events was widespread in the form of nuclear anxiety. Examples include the 1958 Italian film The Day the Sky Exploded, the 1967 novel A Torrent of Faces by James Blish and Norman L. Knight, and the 1968 Japanese film The Green Slime. In Clarke's 1973 novel Rendezvous with Rama, a disastrous asteroid impact motivates humanity to keep close track of Solar System objects thereafter. Gregory Benford wrote three stories in short succession that revolve around the topic: "Icarus Descending" in 1973, "How It All Went" in 1976, and Shiva Descending in 1980—the last one in collaboration with William Rotsler. Clarke revisited the theme in 1993 with the novel The Hammer of God, which revolves around efforts to avert the disaster.

Successive boosts to the theme's popularity came in 1980 with the publication of the Alvarez hypothesis, which states that the extinction of the dinosaurs 65 million years ago was caused by an asteroid impact that created the Chicxulub crater off the coast of Mexico, and in 1994 with the collision of Comet Shoemaker–Levy 9 with Jupiter. The latter in particular is credited with inspiring a large number of disaster films and other on-screen portrayals of impact events or threats thereof—be they by asteroids or other objects such as comets—in the years that followed. Among these are the 1997 TV miniseries Asteroid and the 1998 film Armageddon; the concept had earlier appeared in the 1979 film Meteor. Brian Stableford writes in Science Fact and Science Fiction: An Encyclopedia that by the beginning of the new millennium, asteroidal impact events and climate change were the two most popular scenarios in apocalyptic fiction.

Altering asteroid trajectories, besides being a means to avert impact events as in Roger MacBride Allen's 1988 novel Farside Cannon, also appears in fiction as a way to cause them. In Bob Shaw's 1981 novel The Ceres Solution, Ceres is deliberately crashed into the Moon. Impact events are occasionally weaponized; Earth is targeted with asteroids in this manner by aliens as a form of interplanetary warfare in Heinlein's 1959 novel Starship Troopers, Niven and Jerry Pournelle's 1985 novel Footfall, and David Feintuch's 1996 novel Fisherman's Hope. A human redirects asteroids from the distant Oort cloud towards Earth in an act of attempted mass murder in Don Bingle's 2002 short story "Patience", and an asteroid is set on a collision course with one of the moons of Neptune to create an additional planetary ring in Alastair Reynolds's 2012 short story "Vainglory", while another human-caused—but this time unintentional—impact event appears in Stephen Baxter's 1997 novel Titan. Asteroid diversion also appears in Charles L. Harness's 2000 time travel story "A Boost in Time" in an attempt to save the dinosaurs from extinction.

== See also ==
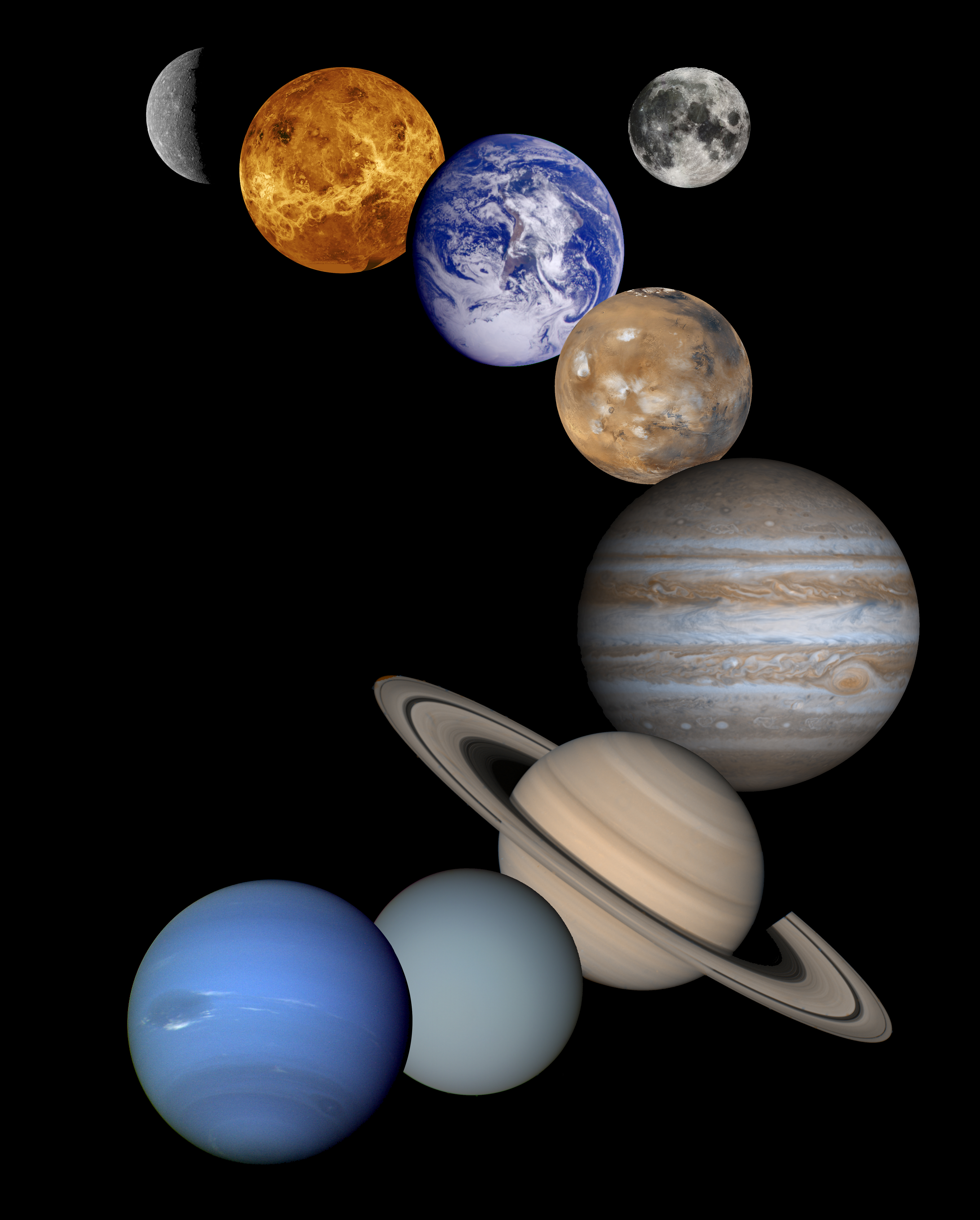
Clicking on a planet leads to the article about its depiction in fiction.

- Comets in fiction
- Pluto in fiction
- Tunguska event in fiction
