= Encyclopedia of Science Fiction (1978 book) =

English language reference work

- The cover of the first edition of "Encyclopedia of Science Fiction"
- Editor: Robert Holdstock (consulting editor)
- Cover artist: Tony Roberts
- Language: English
- Subject: Science fiction
- Publisher: Octopus Books
- Publication date: 1978
- Publication place: United Kingdom
- Pages: 224
- ISBN: 0706407563

Encyclopedia of Science Fiction is a 1978 book of essays about the science fiction genre, largely as a literary form but also covering cinema, TV and illustration.

== Articles and content ==
The articles were written by a number of well known writers, critics, and editors, covering a number of topics, including the history of the genre, alien encounters, technology, and sci-fi art and cinema. The consultant editor was fantasy and science fiction author Robert Holdstock who also contributed a chapter on modern perceptions of science fiction. The foreword was written by Isaac Asimov. Other notable contributors include novelists Brian Stableford, Harry Harrison, and Christopher Priest, the editor and publisher Malcolm Edwards, and the astronomer Patrick Moore. The book also contained a number of lavish full colour illustrations, often featuring magazine and novel cover art by artists such as Melvyn Grant, Kelly Freas, Joe Petagno and Chris Foss. The cover art was by the artist Tony Roberts.

== Legacy ==
In a 1995 article in Utopian Studies, critic Nicholas Ruddick, comparing the book to its contemporary, The Visual Encyclopedia of Science Fiction (1977), described both books as having "both stood up well as multi-authored visual encyclopedias - that it is they both contain striking pictorial spreads". The book has also been cited in other academic publications such as Journal of the Society of Architectural Historians, Modern Fiction Studies, and American Studies International.

== See also ==
- The Encyclopedia of Fantasy (1997), edited by John Clute and John Grant
- The Visual Encyclopedia of Science Fiction (1977), edited by Brian Ash
- The Encyclopedia of Science Fiction (1979), edited by Pete Nicholls and John Clute; 2nd, 1993; 3rd, 2011 online and continuously revised
- The Greenwood Encyclopedia of Science Fiction and Fantasy (2005), edited by Gary Westfahl
