= Roman Frederick Starzl =

American novelist

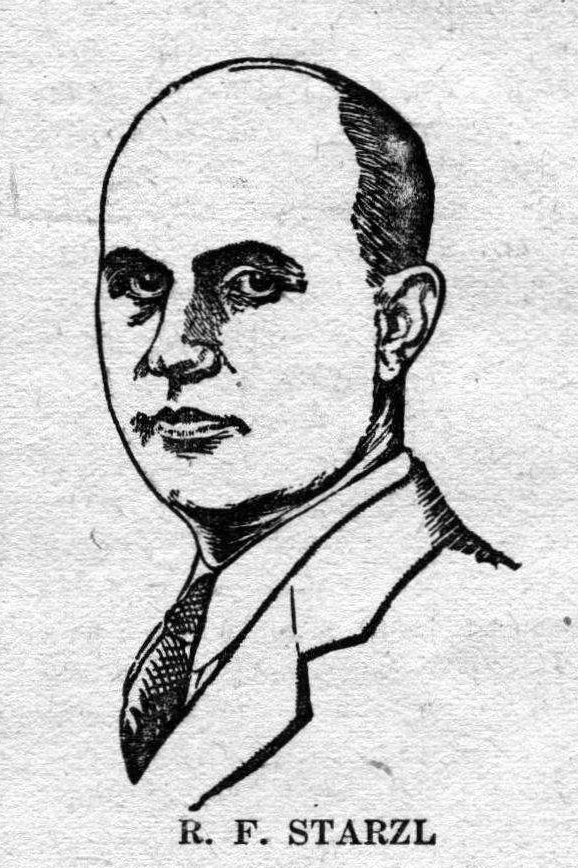
- Roman F. Starzl as pictured in Wonder Stories in 1930
- Born: December 10, 1899; Le Mars, Iowa
- Died: April 8, 1976; Le Mars, Iowa
- Occupation: writer
- Known for: science fiction
- Children: 4
- Relatives: Thomas E. Starzl (son, physician)

Roman Frederick Starzl (December 10, 1899 – April 8, 1976) was an American writer. He, and earlier, his father (John V. Starzl), owned the Le Mars Globe-Post newspaper of Le Mars, Iowa. Roman Frederick was also the father of physician Thomas E. Starzl. His writing is largely forgotten now, but he was called a "master" by the pioneer of space opera E. E. Smith. Starzl's Interplanetary Flying Patrol, in The Hornets of Space, may have influenced Smith's Galactic Patrol. There is an extensive interview with Thomas Starzl about his father in Eric Leif Davin's Pioneers of Wonder.

== Biography ==
Born Roman Frederick Starzl, he was the son of John (born Johann) V. Starzl and Margaret Theisen. John V. Starzl was born April 9, 1865, in Bischofteinitz (later known as Věvrov) in the Austrian Empire, the son of Josef Starzl and Magdalena Ruba. Josef Starzl immigrated with his wife and 5 children (including John) in 1878 to the USA. John V. Starzl sold his pharmacy in Chicago around the time of his marriage and moved back to Le Mars, Iowa, near where his Bohemian immigrant parents had settled after immigration. There, he purchased the German-language newspaper, Der Herold, which later became Le Mars Globe Post, and raised Starzl and two other surviving children. Starzl started his career as a reporter for this newspaper. He reportedly started writing for pulp magazines as part of his efforts to raise enough money for a specific goal. Said goal was to acquire ownership of the newspaper and printing establishment associated with his family. Starzl eventually achieved this goal and retired from writing. Or so the story goes. His writing career indeed lasted only six years (1929–1934), during which he published about 24 stories. But it is possible that his writing career ended as his duties in the newspaper increased. A decision of necessity rather than choice. He became a partner in the Globe-Post in 1934, and sole owner and publisher in 1940. He continued in this role until 1968, when his printing plant fell victim to a fire. He was a member of both the German Rocket Society and the American Rocket Society. Later in life, he developed an interest in right-wing politics.

His literary output in science-fiction consists of about twenty stories, a few of them in collaborations with Everett E. Smith and Festus Pragnell. He also tried his hand in other genres. His stories are essentially "action fiction with science-fictional trappings". Though nine of them feature the Interplanetary Flying Police, they can hardly be seen as a series. There is little to no consistency between them, and they are often set in different time periods. He managed to somewhat stand out among the writers of this era, through a skill with words and a capacity for creative ideas. He did not, however, avoid the tendencies of his contemporaries in science fiction. Already in 1931, the readers of Wonder Stories complained that some of the stories published in the periodical seemed to be regular western fiction, crime fiction, adventure fiction with superficial science-fiction elements (such as placing the action in a future era or another planet). Stories like The Man who Changed the Future (1931) by Starzl are evidence that this was quite true.

His first story Out of the Sub-Universe (Summer, 1928), was featured in an issue of Amazing Stories Quarterly and inspired its cover. It depicted a young couple shrinking in size. The story built on an idea previously used in The Man from the Atom (1923) by Green Peyton Wertenbaker, but it also served as a parody of the Golden Atom tales by Ray Cummings. The Last Planet (1934), on the other hand, seems to be a precursor to the generation ship tales. Unfortunately, Starzl never fully dwelt on the subject. Leaving The Voyage That Lasted 600 Years (1940) by Don Wilcox to be the first fully realized example of this subgenre.

== Partial list of works ==
=== Short stories ===
- Out of the Sub-Universe (Summer, 1928), first published in Amazing Stories Quarterly. Professor Halley (the protagonist) has conducted experiments with cosmic rays, discovering a method of resizing (both shrinking and enlarging) items and living beings. He has also discovered the existence of sub-universes within the structure of the atom. He has managed to send items to an atomic world, and then successfully retrieve them. The story begins when Halley attempts to send two human volunteers to this atomic world, using the same method of shrinking them. The volunteers are his daughter Shirley and her prospective fiancé Hale. They are supposed to stay in sub-atomic size for a mere half-an-hour. When Halley attempts to retrieve them, he is surprised to see a population of about 200 individuals emerge from the sub-atomic world. He learns that time within the sub-universe passes at an accelerated pace. While only half-an-hour passed for him, untold millennia passed within the atom. Shirley and Hale are long dead, and the newcomers consider them founding figures of their culture. In other words, as subjects became smaller their subjective time became faster. Minutes of Halley's time translated to the passing of entire generations of descendants for Shirley and Hale. While this was far from the first story concerning shrinking, concerning differences in time was a new element. The story is considered a pioneer in the use of "differential time", time passing in different paces. But E. F. Bleiler points that it was not the first of its kind, as it had a precursor in The Man from the Atom (1923) by Green Peyton Wertenbaker. Gary Westfahl calls attention to another element of the story. Accidentally or not, humanity colonizes a subatomic world. Making this an early use of the frontier theme in science-fiction. The theme is represented by tales where humans seek new homes in space (notably used by Robert A. Heinlein and Ray Bradbury), underneath the sea (Arthur C. Clarke, Hal Clement), on the upper atmosphere (Hugo Gernsback, Edmond Hamilton), underground (Daniel F. Galouye, Harlan Ellison), in alternative realities (Clifford D. Simak, Philip K. Dick), through time-traveling to the distant past (Robert Silverberg, Clifford D. Simak), or entering cyberspace (William Gibson, Greg Egan). Westfahl considers this to be a major theme of the entire genre. Robert A. W. Lowndes praised the story's "surprise" ending as "not only logical but necessary".
- Madness of the Dust (May 1930), first published in Amazing Stories. Set in the early 21st century, "not too long" after the year 2025. The main action takes place on planet Mars, with a description of its surface deriving from the theories of Giovanni Schiaparelli. There is also mention of planet Venus as a vacation center. The native Martians are depicted as gentle humanoid giants. There is reference to a native aristocracy with superior cognitive skills, but the only representatives of the race actually depicted are simple-minded workers. The protagonist is an Earthman, John Farrington, who serves as a supervisor in the borium mines. The position pays well but comes at a high cost. All Earthmen who work in the mines eventually succumb to "dust madness", a chemical side-effect which drives them to "homicidal fury". Farrington took the risk willingly, because it was the only way he could afford to marry his beloved Alfreda. When he starts showing symptoms of madness, a spaceship arrives to collect him. Its pilot, Steve, is both an old friend and a rival suitor for the hand of Alfreda. In his madness, Farrington suspects that Steve is there to undermine him. When Steve experiences his own medical emergency, appendicitis, in mid-flight, there begins a period of inner struggle for Farrington. His mind constantly alternates between periods of murderous rage towards Steve, and more lucid moments of feeling responsible and trying to provide medical assistance.

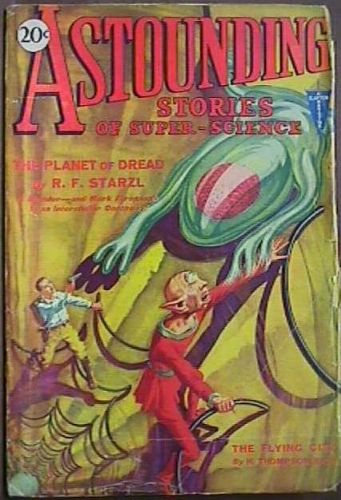
Starzl's "The Planet of Dread" was the cover story in the August 1930 Astounding Stories

- The Planet of Dread (August 1930), first published in Astounding Stories. Set in the 23rd century, on the fictional planet Inra. The main characters are adventurer Mark Forepaugh and his dim-witted servant Gunga. The latter is a one-eyed Martian. The planet has a tropical climate and is inhabited by a native primitive culture. Forepaugh is there hunting for local specimens of orchids which he plans to sell to the markets of Earth. His advanced weaponry is quite capable of keeping him safe, and its powered by hydrogen fuel cylinders. Unfortunately, he placed his trust on the wrong supply man. His energy reserves end much sooner than expected, leaving him and Gunga stranded in a hostile environment. The two travelers try to make their way towards the mountains of the planet, which enjoy a cooler climate, while facing local predators. Forepaugh has to rely on a less-advanced weapon, which he typically carries with him for sentimental reasons: a revolver dating to the American frontier. Bleiler felt that the story was "capable pulp work", but lacked in novel elements. The most memorable character, in his view, was a "highly intelligent" amoeboid with the ability to control the wills of others beings.
- The King of the Black Bowl (September 1930), first published in Wonder Stories. Set in the year 1935, at the city of Chicago. The subject matter seems derived from contemporary predictions and humor that organized crime would formally take control of this city. In the near-future setting of the story, leading gangster Felix Spumelli has become the de facto ruler of Chicago. But he still finds his power insufficient. He kidnaps local physicist Dawkelson and has him isolate the city from the rest of the world. Chicago becomes a domed city, surrounded by a zone of nothingness in the shape of a black bowl. With the exception of water nothing is able to enter or leave the city, including all forms of radiation. Spumelli becomes the self-proclaimed king of Chicago and imposes a harsh occupation rule over the city. His private security force patrols the city in armored vehicles. Meanwhile, two former students of Dawkelson (Darwin Ellis, and Buck Holt) strive to rescue their mentor.
- The Globoid Terror (November 1930), first published in Amazing Stories. One of the first two stories featuring the Interplanetary Flying Police. Set in the 22nd century, c. 2124, on planet Venus. Venus is a tropical planet inhabited by strange life forms. The diamond mines of the planet produce "gray diamonds" that have proven more useful for industrial purposes than both the natural gemstones of Earth and the synthetic diamonds. Shortly after leaving the planet, a number of gray diamonds seem to disappear without a trace. The recurring incidents are deemed threatening to the industry and attract the attention of the Interplanetary Flying Police. Police corporal Heywood Crombie is tasked with investigating the problem at its source, Venus itself. Shortly following his arrival, Crombie faces an assassination attempt within his own bedroom. His descent into the mines is marked by a second attempt on his life, involving a sabotaged elevator. The focus of the story shifts from Crombie attempting to actually investigate the case to merely trying to survive. The title is in reference to a predatory amphibian lifeform of Venus, which is resistant to rayguns. The crime turns out to be a typical inside job, committed by people in trusted places. Between the mines and the storage facilities, a number of real diamonds were stolen and replaced by artificial gems. The latter were unstable in structure, eventually disintegrating and so "vanishing". Bleiler considered the story to have a strong opening for an action story, although he found its further scenes and conclusion rather weak.
- Hornets of Space (November 1930), first published in Wonder Stories. Also one of the first two stories featuring the Interplanetary Flying Police. Set in the 23rd century, in space around the asteroid Eros. The Hornets of the title are tiny one-man spaceships, operated by the police and armed with torpedoes. The spaceliner Medusa is attacked by the aging warship Redoubtable, currently operated by a space pirate. Aboard the spaceliner are a unit of the police who have to react to the situation. Their combat efforts are hampered by a space cloud which interferes with the effectiveness of their weapons. The story relies on the character dynamics between the men of the police. The key characters are Strickland and Henderson. Through Strickland, the reader glimpses the social interactions aboard the ship: the mutual hostility between himself and an older crew member; the budding romance between himself and a female radio operator; et cetera; while Henderson is a social pariah, due to being branded a coward for his actions in a previous conflict. For him this battle is his chance at winning redemption. Bleiler considered this story competently written but "lifeless".
- The Terrors of Aryl (March 1931), first published in Wonder Stories. The third story featuring the Interplanetary Flying Police. Set in the late 20th century or early 21st century, with the year 1998 mentioned as recent. The premise involves the existence of a small intra-Mercurial planet, (that is, a planet inside the orbit of Mercury), called Aryl. Aryl has a strange atmosphere which shields it from the solar rays, leaving it with a tropical climate rather than an extremely high surface temperature. The atmosphere is breathable to humans and able to sustain life. The atmosphere distorts light, rendering the planet practically invisible from Earth and causing mirages on its surface area. Police corporal Henley and private Elsinger are the sole crew members of a spaceship which pursues space pirate Captain Nirvo. Their pursuit ends with them crash-landing on Aryl. They realize that Nirvo probably has set a homebase on the planet. After Elsinger helps his superior recover from a fever, the two of them start searching for this homebase. At this point, taking over the pirate's ship is their only chance of ever leaving the planet. First, they have to consider the carnivorous lifeforms of Aryl. An ending plot twist reveals that Nirvo holds captive the love interest of Henley. Bleiler considered this a competent adventure story, but pointed to the damsel in distress scenario as a weakness.
- The Earthman's Burden (June 1931), first published in Astounding Stories. The fourth story featuring the Interplanetary Flying Police. Set in an undated future era, mostly on the planet Mercury which is featured as having a tropical climate. The native Mercurians are a primitive culture, with an appearance resembling humanoid frogs. The Mercurian Trading Concession (M.T.C) is a merchant company from Earth which has set up factories (trading posts) on the planet. They trade with the natives to acquire a local natural gum which is the only known cure for cancer. The successive factors (mercantile agents) of the Blue River Station keep disappearing. The Police tasks Olear with investigating the situation. He develops a poor working relationship with the current factor, but proves effective in stealthily investigating the surrounding area and resolving the mystery. The villain turns out to be one of the last surviving members of a dying species: a Plutonian. His species once thrived on the benefits of a super-science now nearly lost. The tale explains that the Plutonians had a history of alien visitations to Earth, and had gained a place in folk memory... as the Devil. As featured in this story, Plutonians have horns, hooves, and tails.
- The Man who changed the Future (June 1931), first published in Wonder Stories. A time travel story, set in the years 1930 and 2030. The city of Lakopolis where the action takes place is an obvious stand-in for Chicago. In the year 1930, crime-ridden Lakopolis has gangsters acting openly and exercising power. Park Helm, the protagonist, would like to do something about this situation. However, for the time being, he wonders of the long-term consequences of the current situation; one Professor Nicholson offers him a chance to find out about them. The scientist has developed a way to send the astral body of a person to any point in time, a method involving the magnetic fields of a giant electric generator disrupting the aether. Helm successfully arrives in the year 2030, as an unseen spectator. He finds Lakopolis worse than ever and gangsters running rampant. When he witnesses an individual gangster trying to force marriage on a young woman, Helm tries to intervene and somehow materializes a body for himself. Permanently settling in this era, Helm becomes the leader of a reform movement. His movement tries to reclaim this city for its honest citizens. Bleiler found this story unsuccessful, and self-contradictory. After a long explanation that only the astral body of the individual can travel in time, not his corporeal body, the story shifts in the opposite direction, with no real explanation.
- The Planet of Despair (July 1931), first published in Wonder Stories. The fifth story featuring the Interplanetary Flying Police. Set in the 40th century, in the year 3977, at the planets Earth and Pluto, the background of the story involves a war between the two planets, taking place in 3927. The Plutonians had an advantage in technology, which allowed them to win. First they managed to disintegrate the Terrestrial space fleet, and then displaced the Earth itself from its orbit, forcing the Earth to surrender with no further negotiations. The Plutonians returned the Earth to its original orbit and allowed the Interplanetary Flying Police to continue operating in the inner planets. The price for these favors was having the Earthmen pay them an annual tribute of 30 healthy men and women. The Plutonians are nearly passionless and emotionless, anger being the sole emotion they experience. For fifty years they conduct human subject research, in a vain attempt to understand the human capacity for emotions. Their human specimens never survive the process of the experimentation. The story proper begins when officer Hi Buckram of the Police returns to Earth on furlough. He learns that his beloved Cinda Mara is among the next group to be sent to Pluto for experimentation. Buckram is determined to join her in this journey, and manages to gain a spot through coercion and bribery. Fernon, chief scientist of the Plutonians, finds him psychologically interesting and starts having regular conversations with him. Buckram learns the motives behind the Plutonians' research, and seemingly agrees to help Fernon discover the long-sought secret of human emotion. On Pluto itself, Buckram is allowed to work in the energy facilities of the planet. He is actually seeking a way to make the entire planet explode. Bleiler found the conclusion of the story rather predictable and unconvincing.
- If the Sun died (August 1931), first published in Astounding Stories. The story is set in the distant future, c. the 650th century, below the surface of planet Earth. The background of the story involves a disaster in the 500th century, when solar radiation became insufficient to provide warmth and sustenance to humanity. Thinking that the Sun itself was dying out, humanity transferred itself to the caverns. The past 15 millennia have seen some poor developments for the population of Subterranea. A small, dynamic class of technies (scientists and technicians) emerged to maintain and expand the machinery providing food and breathable air to humanity. But the vast majority of the population has lost its drive, becoming indolent. By the point the proper story begins, there is no skilled labor force to assist the technies in their maintenance duties. Parts of the life-sustaining machinery have fallen into decay, and the technies realize that it is only a matter of time before the whole system breaks down. They believe that it is time to see whether surface conditions have improved, but the rest of the population is against any such proposal. The opposition points out that they can not be certain what is on the surface, citing that the last cavern settlement which tried to reach the surface ended in opening up a hole below the Atlantic Ocean and drowned. Eventually protagonist Mich'l Ares and a small group of technies escape to the surface, leaving Subterranea to its fate. To their surprise, surface conditions are downright pleasant. They soon realize what actually happened in the 500th century. The Sun was not dying. The Earth was just entering another glacial period, one that apparently ended in the intervening millennia.
- A 20th century Medusa (September 1931), first published in Wonder Stories. The story is set in the year 1940, mostly in Chicago and its vicinity. While gangsters are running the city, a mysterious female figure seems to be controlling the criminal underworld. Her enemies tend to be found either paralyzed, or fully petrified. Rumor has it that the mystery woman is Medusa, the Gorgon of antiquity, somehow still alive. A contradictory rumor speaks of a whole race of Medusas, originating in Atlantis. The protagonist, Hal Gibbs, is an agent of the United States Secret Service. His determination, to find out who Medusa is, leads him to her lair where he is forcibly recruited into the ranks of her organization. Medusa turns out to be a young woman who dresses in the fashion of classical antiquity. She uses paralyzing disks to immobilize her enemies. During an ambitious caper, Medusa herself foils the plan and undermines the organization from within. She is herself a victim in this affair, having been under hypnosis for her entire reign over Chicago. The true mastermind controlling her, and through her the underworld and the city, is revealed to be an influential member of local society. He was otherwise known as a leading figure of a reform movement. Bleiler found this "fanciful thriller" rather unconvincing, concluding that crime fiction was never the forte of Starzl.
- In the Orbit of Saturn (October 1931), first published in Astounding Stories. The sixth story featuring the Interplanetary Flying Police. Set in the 22nd century, in the year 2159, in the space surrounding the outer planets. The spaceship Celestia is captured by space pirates, who use a type of cloaking device to remain invisible to other ships. Quirl Finner, a member of the police, is among the captives. He spends part of the story trying hard to protect the safety of Lenore, "a remarkably rich young woman". Finner has ambiguous feelings about the pirates themselves. They are led by Captain Strom, who is both an honorable man and an idealist dreamer. Once a would-be social reformer, Strom was framed for treason and exiled. He managed to escape and turn to crime, but crime and piracy are a means to an end for him. He still dreams of social reform and wants to acquire the means to colonize a small planet, and create his ideal society. Finner can sympathize with this dream. But the more wicked side of the pirates is represented by mate Gore, a brutal thug-for-hire, who treats the prisoners harshly. The story concludes with a mutiny on board and with Finner sabotaging the cloaking device, leaving the pirate ship an easy target for the police. Bleiler considered this a well-written action story. In his view, the developing romance between the wealthy woman and her poor protector adds a fairy tale aspect to the story.
- The Martian Cabal (May 1932), first published in Astounding Stories. The seventh story featuring the Interplanetary Flying Police, and a novelette in length. The setting in time is left unspecified, though there is a reference to the 22nd century as either ongoing or fairly recent. The action is set on planet Mars. There is an upcoming election on the planet and all political forces involved (representing big business, the military, the democratic faction and the monarchists) seem equally corrupt and ruthless. Sime Hemingway, an undercover agent of the police, tries to uncover the multiple concurrent conspiracies of this world. Among other plots featured, corrupt "planetary president" Wilcox plans to extend his authority to the entire Solar System through military means, having achieved the necessary funding from interplanetary bankers. His co-conspirator Scar Balta aspires to become a subordinate king in the new regime. He tries to legitimize his would-be royal status by marrying Princess Sira, one of the heirs to an old monarchic regime. Prince Joro, a rival heir, has his own plans to bring the monarchists to power. Bleiler found this complex story "pretty silly".

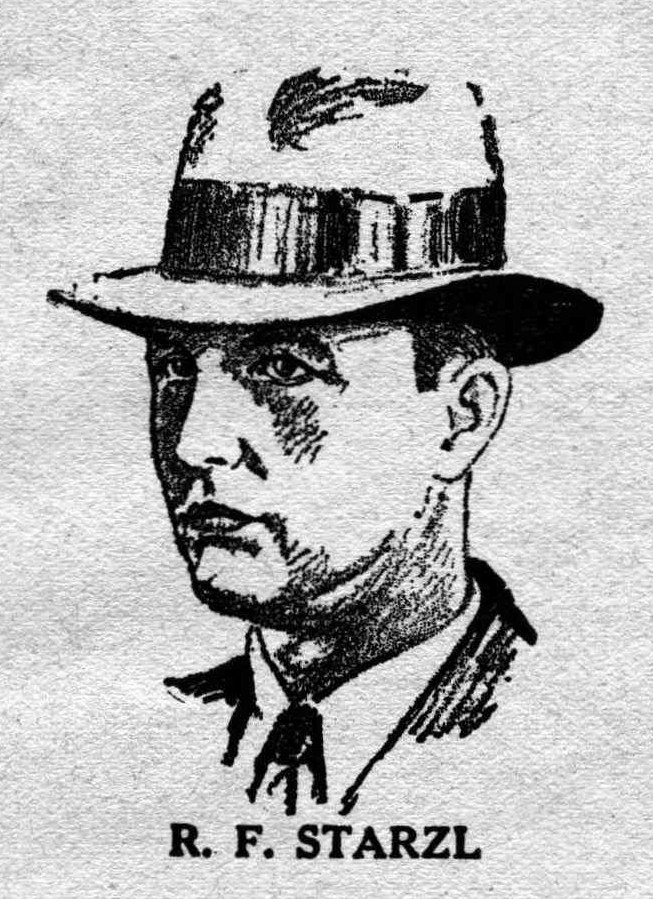
Roman F. Starzl as depicted in an illustration accompanying the publication of "The Power Satellite" in Wonder Stories in 1932

- The Power Satellite (June 1932), first published in Wonder Stories. The eighth story featuring the Interplanetary Flying Police. Set in an unspecified future era, on Triton. Starzl adds the alternate name "Goddard" for this satellite, naming it after Robert H. Goddard. The premise of the story is that Triton/Goddard has gained in significance to the economy of the inner planets. The planets Venus, Earth, and Mars have set up mines on its surface, extracting a radioactive material called "catalyte". This material has proven invaluable to industry and space travel. An interplanetary treaty determines the amounts that each planet can claim from the yearly production of the mines. When large quantities of catalyte disappear, the police take an interest and task Anton Waite of Earth to investigate the situation. The chief deviation, from previous stories of Starzl, is that Venusians and Martians are featured not as aliens, but as descendants of human colonists which diverged into new variants of humanity. The development is used to explain a romantic subplot between Waite and a female Martian. Otherwise, the story is rather formulaic.
- The Venus Germ (November 1932), first published in Wonder Stories. Co-written by Festus Pragnell. The ninth (and last) story featuring the Interplanetary Flying Police. The story is set in the 40th century, in the year 3976, on planets Venus, and Earth. The background of the story involves the Earth colonizing Venus. The Venusian colonists have diverged into a variant of humanity, their most notable physical difference being "a mane of hair down their spine." The parent planet keeps the colony under political control and economic subjugation, despite the colonists' desire for independence. The financial elite of Earth simply wish to exploit the colony and its resources, and the politicians of Earth obey the wishes of their true masters. The story proper begins when a lab experiment involving bacteriophages backfires spectacularly. Instead of finding a cure for cancer, the research scientists accidentally unleash an epidemic which proceeds to claim millions of lives. The scientists of Earth fail to find a cure, but their Venusian counterparts soon develop an antitoxin. But they refuse to offer the treatment to the Earthmen, unless terms for the political independence of Venus can be reached. The politicians are willing to reach terms, but decolonization efforts are hindered by the business elite of Earth, who wish to maintain their investments on Venus at all costs. The heroes of the story are Glenn Haye and his friend Panco. The former is a righteous member of the police, the other a kind-hearted Venusian. They struggle to see that justice prevails and lives are saved. Curiously, the tale never really questions the integrity of a police force serving an otherwise thoroughly corrupt system. Bleiler sees this story as a tale of capitalist exploitation, and the exploited colonists fighting back; which gives the tale a Marxist undercurrent, probably reflecting Pragnell's ideas.
- The Metal Moon (Winter, 1932), first published in Wonder Stories Quarterly. Co-written by an Everett C. Smith. It is uncertain if this was the same person who wrote Industry Views the teaching of English (1956) two decades later. A tale set in the 10,002nd century, in the year 1,000,144, in the vicinity of planet Jupiter. The background of the story has it that long ago humanity managed to expand beyond the inner planets. But in the 800th century, a massive meteor swarm ended interplanetary travel and communications. The fate of several colonies remains unknown. The story proper chronicles the first attempt in thousands of years to travel beyond Mars.
- The Last Planet (April 1934), first published in Wonder Stories. The story is set in the distant future, c. the 10,000th century. The premise is that the Sun is dying out and the Solar System has become too cold to sustain life. The remnants of humanity survive on the warmest planet left, Mercury, though they aspire to migrate away from this doomed stellar system. They have located a suitable planet for colonization, standing a light-year away from their current position, and have worked for many years in developing a massive spaceship capable of interstellar flight. The problem is that the ship, called Ventura, can not complete its mission by transferring all of humanity in a single journey. Two or more journeys are necessary. When it comes time to decide who will go first and who will have to wait for the ship to return, class conflict begins in earnest. The technies (scientists and engineers) claim the right to man the maiden voyage, citing a previous decision in their favor. However, the members of the financial and legal elites, who funded the project, claim the privilege for themselves. The working class protests any plans to leave it behind, and even threatens to sabotage the spaceship. A fourth group causes problems, the self-proclaimed "Peace Makers." They are a group of rogues, outlaws, and experts of strong-arm tactics, who are supposed to serve as a security force for the technies. Actually they are trying to ensure passage for themselves and plot to take over the ship. At the heart of the story is a love triangle between a brilliant scientist, Jay (a leading technie), a dynamic bad boy, Curtes (a commander of the Peace Makers), and the lady Idar. The latter is romantically involved with Jay, but lusts after Curtes. In that aspect, Bleiler considers this a "routine" story.
- Dimension of the Conquered (October 1934), first published in Astounding Stories. A dimension-spanning tale, told in a first-person narrative. The narrator tries to explain his role in a plot which resulted in a brilliant scientist declared insane and institutionalized. The narrative begins when the scientist, Gerald P. Simeon, invites various acquaintances to demonstrate his breakthroughs in exploring other dimensions. He has managed to both communicate with a culture of the Fourth dimension, and to create a device translating their language to English and vice versa. An unseen extra-dimensional being explains that a "cosmic storm" had once affected the planet Earth, creating two divergent versions of it: one is their own Earth and the other a counterpart in the fourth dimension. Now the being asks for assistance. It belongs to the dominant race of its planet, a sentient and civilized race. But they have long used a race of savages as servants, and now the savages are attempting to overthrow them. Its race never developed weapons, and now would need the human's knowledge of the subject to survive in their hour of need. Once Simeon establishes visual contact with the other Earth, his associates are surprised in many ways. The city where the entity resides is remarkably similar to their own. But the entity and its race are sentient humanoid wasps, while the servant race of savages are sub-humans. Simeon is willing to serve the masters over the servants, which causes his associates to react violently. They sever all communications with the fourth dimension, destroy his equipment, and have him committed to an insane asylum. Bleiler found this to be an above-average story, with interesting implications. The master race is very similar to humans in mentality, but not in appearance. The servant race is physically identical to humans, but intellectually different; leaving open questions concerning their true natures and that of human nature.

== Mentions by other writers ==
The comic book issue Justice League of America No. 18 (March 1963) featured the story "Journey into the Micro-World", featuring a travel to a sub-atomic world. The story used a familiar theme from Out of the Sub-Universe (Summer, 1928), while writer Gardner Fox and editor Julius Schwartz probably had a hand in naming its miniature civilization "Starzl", in tribute to the writer. Book I of the science fiction trilogy The Nova Project 70 written by Gregory R. Miller and Fabion O. Reeves mentions Starzyl in the acknowledgements.

== Sources ==
- Ashley, Mike; Lowndes, Robert A. W. (2004), The Gernsback Days: A Study of the Evolution of Modern Science Fiction from 1911 to 1936, Wildside Press LLC, ISBN 978-0809510559
- Bleiler, Everett Franklin; Bleiler, Richard James (1998), Science-fiction: The Gernsback Years, Kent State University Press, ISBN 978-0873386043
- Eury, Michael (2005), Justice League Companion: A Historical And Speculative Overview Of The Silver Age Justice League Of America, TwoMorrows Publishing, ISBN 978-1893905481
- Westfahl, Gary (2005), The Greenwood encyclopedia of science fiction and fantasy: themes, works and wonders, Vol. 1, Greenwood Publishing Group, ISBN 978-0313329517
