= Science Fiction Literature Through History: An Encyclopedia =

2021 reference work by Gary Westfahl

- Author: Gary Westfahl
- Language: English
- Subject: Science fiction
- Publisher: ABC-Clio/Greenwood
- Publication date: 2021
- Publication place: United States
- Pages: xxx + 766 (two volumes)
- ISBN: 978-1-4408-6617-3 (ebook)
- Dewey Decimal: 809.3/87603
- LC Class: PN3448.S45

Science Fiction Literature Through History: An Encyclopedia is a 2021 reference work written by science fiction scholar Gary Westfahl and published by ABC-Clio/Greenwood. The book contains eight essays on the history of science fiction, eleven thematic essays on how different topics relate to science fiction, and 250 entries on various science fiction subgenres, authors, works, and motifs. It received positive reviews, with critics finding it to be well-researched and useful for students in particular.

== History ==
Author Gary Westfahl (born 1951) is an American science fiction scholar who had previously written extensively on the subject and edited The Greenwood Encyclopedia of Science Fiction and Fantasy (2005). Science Fiction Literature Through History: An Encyclopedia was written entirely by Westfahl, and the contents are original to this work. The book was simultaneously published as a two-volume hardcover set and in ebook format in July 2021 by ABC-Clio/Greenwood, the same imprint that had previously published The Greenwood Encyclopedia of Science Fiction and Fantasy.

== Contents ==
The first one hundred pages of the book, after the prefatory material, consist of essays. Eight essays cover the history of science fiction, from "Science Fiction in the Ancient World and the Middle Ages" to "Science Fiction in the Twenty-First Century". This is followed by eleven thematic essays on topics ranging from "Science and Science Fiction" and "Racial Issues in Science Fiction" to "Young Adult Science Fiction" and "Global Science Fiction".

The bulk of the work consists of 250 encyclopaedic entries, listed alphabetically. Topics covered by the entries include various authors both within science fiction (e.g. Isaac Asimov) and without (e.g. William Shakespeare), works ranging from science fiction novels such as A Canticle for Leibowitz and the television show Doctor Who to predecessors of the genre like Homer's Odyssey and Dante Alighieri's Divine Comedy, science fiction subgenres like cyberpunk and space opera, and motifs such as virtual reality and linguistics. Each entry has a list of sources for further reading. Many entries contain boxed sidebars on specific aspects of the topic, and some entries on living authors such as Connie Willis contain brief interviews.

== Reception ==
Marcia G. Welsh reviewed the book for Library Journal in October 2021, comparing it favourably to The Cambridge Companion to Science Fiction (2003) edited by Edward James and Farah Mendlesohn and The Routledge Companion to Science Fiction (2009) edited by Mark Bould, Andrew M. Butler, Adam Roberts, and Sherryl Vint. In her estimation, it would be useful for researching specific aspects of science fiction (e.g. particular authors or themes) at levels ranging between middle school and college. Welsh also wrote that the knowledge on display and the way it is presented would make the book appeal to science fiction fans.

Lesley Farmer, reviewing the encyclopedia for Booklist in December 2021, commented that the combination of essays with broad scopes and entries with specific ones "results in a satisfying and balanced sf encyclopedia that should have wide readership". Farmer further praised the writing style, finding it to exhibit both clarity and concision.

W. L. Svitavsky wrote in Choice: Current Reviews for Academic Libraries in June 2022 that "an up-to-date, thorough encyclopedia of SF literature is overdue". In Svitavsky's opinion, Westfahl's work surpasses George Mann's The Mammoth Encyclopedia of Science Fiction (2001) in terms of critical insight and M. Keith Booker's Historical Dictionary of Science Fiction in Literature (2014) in terms of how extensive the entries are. On the scope, Svitavsky commented that there is an "underrepresentation of recent authors whose importance might become clearer over time" and that some topics that might be expected to have dedicated entries do not as a result of space limitations, but also noted that such topics are generally covered in other entries and can thus be located via the index. Overall, Svitavsky found the book to be well-researched and "an invaluable work for understanding SF literature", recommending it at an undergraduate level.

Donald M. Hassler, in a December 2022 review published in Extrapolation, summarized the book as "a very unusual and entertaining project by one of our key critics". He compared the undertaking of writing an encyclopedia of this length to that of Herman Melville's novel Moby-Dick (1851) and surmised from the high price of the work—at US$204—that the customer base was likely intended to mainly be libraries. He found it to distinguish itself from other encyclopedias of science fiction such as Neil Barron's Anatomy of Wonder (1976–2004) and the works of James E. Gunn in certain ways, describing it as "thesis-driven" in contrast to more traditional reference works. Hassler interpreted Westfahl's aim as educating his readers less about literary theory than Westfahl's own views on the genre. In Hassler's view, Westfahl is a "Son of Liberty" who has written a "Declaration of Independence" for "his Nation" of science fiction—further noting that Westfahl takes a very inclusive approach to what the concept encompasses, including works by Virgil and John Milton among others. Another unusual thing noted by Hassler is the intended audience, which he identified as principally being students rather than scholars. He deemed the selection of essays to be determined largely by contemporary politics, writing that Westfahl "aspires to include all writing and all points of view as they pertain to the needs of young people" while omitting things that might appeal more to a scholarly readership such as delineation of how various subgenres differ. Hassler did not find the peculiarities of the book to prevent him from finding it fascinating, commenting that it is "timely and fits our educational needs for an expanded sense of personhood".

== See also ==
- Science Fact and Science Fiction: An Encyclopedia (2006), by Brian Stableford
- The Encyclopedia of Science Fiction (first edition published 1979; now online), edited by Peter Nicholls and John Clute
