= Science-Fiction: The Gernsback Years =

1998 reference work by E. F. Bleiler and Richard Bleiler

- Author: E. F. Bleiler, with the assistance of Richard Bleiler
- Genre: Reference work
- Publisher: Kent State University Press
- Publication date: 1998
- Pages: xxx + 730
- ISBN: 978-0-87338-604-3
- Preceded by: Science-Fiction: The Early Years (1990)

Science-Fiction: The Gernsback Years is a 1998 reference work covering the history of English-language science fiction magazines from 1926 to 1936, comprising 1,835 individual stories by more than 500 different authors across a total of 345 issues from 14 magazines. It was written by E. F. Bleiler with the assistance of his son Richard Bleiler, a follow-up to their previous Science-Fiction: The Early Years (1990).

The book received positive reviews, with critics commending its comprehensiveness and level of detail. Reviewers found it to live up to the standards set by its predecessor. Several critics described it as indispensable; science fiction scholars James E. Gunn and Gary Westfahl both commented that their own previous research would have been greatly aided by the book, had it been available to them.

== Creation ==
Science-Fiction: The Gernsback Years was conceived of as a follow-up to E. F. Bleiler's previous bibliographical reference works, The Guide to Supernatural Fiction (1983) and Science-Fiction: The Early Years (1990). The title refers to science fiction editor Hugo Gernsback, who created the first science fiction magazine—Amazing Stories—in 1926, coined the term "scientifiction", and for whom the science fiction literature Hugo Award is named. E. F. Bleiler researched and summarized the primary literature, while his son Richard Bleiler tracked down biographical and bibliographical details.

== Contents ==
The book begins with a preface and introduction by Bleiler providing background information. This includes an outline of the approach taken and an overview of the magazines, as well as two tables tracking the use of various motifs and story formulas across the time period. Bleiler writes that satire had by this time largely fallen out of favour, and that politically contentious topics such as Prohibition and lynching in the United States and international conflicts such as the Chinese Civil War and Italian invasion of Ethiopia were mostly avoided by science fiction authors. In Bleiler's view, conservatism and traditional gender roles characterized the science fiction of the time, and much of it reflected xenophobic and colonialist attitudes.

The main portion of the book consists of a complete catalogue of all stories published in English-language science fiction magazines between 1926 (when Gernsback founded Amazing) and 1936 (the year Gernsback sold Wonder Stories). The magazines in question include the major publications Amazing, Wonder, and Astounding Stories, as well as their spinoffs such as Amazing Stories Annual and Amazing Stories Quarterly, and minor publications like Flash Gordon Strange Adventure Magazine and Miracle Science and Fantasy Stories. A total of 345 issues from 14 different magazines are covered, of which all but the British publication Scoops are from the United States. The stories are arranged alphabetically by author and then chronologically for each author. Each story receives a summary of its plot spanning a few hundred words, about 200 on average, and additionally a single-sentence critical evaluation by Bleiler. The total number of stories thus covered is 1,835 across 522 pages. Each author also gets a brief biographical description, where such information is known. The total number of authors represented exceeds 500.

The remainder of the book consists of multiple appendices and indices, as well as a bibliography of secondary literature. One of the appendices, entitled "Magazine Histories and Contents", spans 57 pages and covers various information about the magazines including an overview of each magazine's history, the complete contents of each individual issue (both the fiction itself and nonfiction content such as editorials, reviews, and letters), pricing, pagination, and the people involved—publishers, editors, authors, and artists alike. The other appendices include a list of anthologies in which the stories have been reprinted, a list of science fiction poetry, a list of stories that were originally published outside of the magazines but reprinted in them, and a section on magazine artists including black-and-white reproductions of a selection of 13 covers. There are three indices: one for motifs and themes, containing entries like "High civilizations of the past, non-human" and "Mad scientist, motivations, purposes"; one for titles; and one for authors.

== Reception ==
James E. Gunn reviewed the book for Utopian Studies in 1999, writing of it and its two predecessors that "Bleiler's work is so sound and so thorough that every college library ought to have copies, and enterprising scholars may well wish to have the series as close to hand as The Encyclopedia of Science Fiction". He particularly appreciated the "Magazine Histories and Contents" appendix, writing that "Data such as this is invaluable to the scholar and researcher, and I wish I had had the books when I was working on Alternate Worlds and The Road to Science Fiction". Gunn nevertheless identified several negatives. He found the font and three-column layout of the magazine section unnecessarily difficult to read. He also stated that he would have preferred Bleiler to have elaborated on the reasons for his more critical assessments. Gunn further identified some factual errors and criticized a habit of speculating without presenting evidence. Finally, Gunn found the selection of secondary literature in the bibliography lacking, writing that "Bleiler's focus on the literature itself is salutory, but his acquaintance with secondary materials seems hit-and-miss".

Thomas Easton, in a review originally published in the June 1999 issue of Analog Science Fiction and Fact (later republished in Easton's 2006 collection Off the Main Sequence), called the book "an invaluable reference". Besides the main contents of the book, Easton found the description of the science fiction magazine readership in the book's introduction particularly interesting—noting that while Bleiler describes the general readership in a fairly unflattering manner, he also lists a large number of people among the most devoted fans who would go on to be significant personages within the fields of science and literature (according to Easton, "the proportion is such as to leave a Harvard in the dust").

David Pringle, reviewing the book for Science Fiction Studies in July 2000, compared it favourably to its predecessor Science-Fiction: The Early Years—commenting that while it is somewhat shorter in length, it is in turn entirely comprehensive within its scope, and concluding that it is an equally indispensable resource for science fiction scholars. In Pringle's view, Bleiler's reading of the primary material "in a sense, has relieved the rest of us from the necessity of ever having to do likewise", writing that the low availability of many of the magazines and the lack of reprinting of the majority of the stories (in anthologies or otherwise) means that "it is for the detailed second-hand knowledge of these that it provides that Bleiler's book will be particularly valuable". Pringle also commended the detailed knowledge on display, writing that the small number of errors he noted did not detract from the overall impression.

Gary Westfahl, in a 2000 review for Extrapolation, described it as "an indispensable, even wondrous reference book: meticulously researched, thorough in its coverage, usefully organized, and fascinating to read in its entirety". On the usefulness of the volume for scholars, Westfahl described the contents as "information that I would have died for ten or twenty years ago and information that will vastly improve any future research into this era of science fiction history", while at the same time cautioning against using the tome as a substitute for reading the primary literature itself when conducting research.

Michael Schoenecke, reviewing the book for the Journal of American and Comparative Cultures in 2000, praised the work's comprehensiveness within its scope. Schoenecke described the book as "a rich harvest, fascinating and informative".

In the 2002 edition of Reference Guide to Science Fiction, Fantasy and Horror by Michael Burgess and Lisa R. Bartle, the book is described as "both authoritative and well-written", with its level of detail receiving specific praise. The ease of navigation is also highlighted as a positive.

Robert Silverberg described the book in Asimov's Science Fiction in May 2003 as "a monumental work of a grandeur and magnificence verging on lunacy [...] a meticulous work of scholarship with an almost medieval intensity about it, the equivalent of what teams of monks might have spent decades producing in the thirteenth century". Silverberg praised in particular the devotion to reading all the included stories and providing critical commentary, expressing amusement at Bleiler's at times blunt dismissals of literary merit. He nevertheless found himself inspired by the book to revisit some of the more obscure works discussed and suggested readers look into two anthologies of works from this era to get an appreciation for the level of quality some of them reached: Isaac Asimov's Before the Golden Age (1974) and Damon Knight's Science Fiction of the Thirties (1976).

Neil Barron, in the 2004 edition of his Anatomy of Wonder: A Critical Guide to Science Fiction, called the book "[a]n essential companion to the author's equally authoritative Science-Fiction: The Early Years". Gary K. Wolfe, writing in the same volume, similarly described it as "one of the major indispensable works of SF scholarship".

John Clute, writing in The Encyclopedia of Science Fiction, commented that Bleiler's suite of reference works culminating in The Gernsback Years "stands as a central resource for the study of sf books" alongside the works of authors such as Barron and Donald H. Tuck (author of The Encyclopedia of Science Fiction and Fantasy). Clute also wrote that all three works are characterized both by extraordinary scope and extraordinary thoroughness.

== See also ==
- History of US science fiction and fantasy magazines to 1950
- Pulp era of science fiction
