= Science Fact and Science Fiction: An Encyclopedia =

2006 reference work by Brian Stableford

- Author: Brian Stableford
- Language: English
- Publisher: Routledge
- Publication date: 2006
- Pages: xxv + 729
- ISBN: 978-0-415-97460-8

Science Fact and Science Fiction: An Encyclopedia is a 2006 reference work written by Brian Stableford and published by Routledge. It consists of approximately 300 entries on various topics relating to how scientific advancements have influenced fiction. The book received positive reviews, with critics commending it for filling a previously-unoccupied niche in the literature and praising the contents in terms of depth and breadth, although finding the book to be expensive at a price of $165.

== History ==
Author Brian Stableford originally intended the title to be Science Fact and Fiction: An Encyclopedia; the publisher added the second "Science" before the book went into print. A planned follow-up, Folklore and Fantastic Literature, was cancelled as a result of the parent company's department on reference works becoming defunct; Stableford attributed this to the ease of looking up information on the Internet making print media of that kind unprofitable, saying "It looks as if the entire market sector is now effectively dead."

== Contents ==
Stableford said in a 2006 interview with Barbara Godwin for Infinity Plus that the goal of the book is to outline the influence developments in science have had on fiction writing. To this end, the book has approximately 300 entries, ranging from 400 to 4,000 words in length, on topics including concepts like aeronautics and time travel, science fiction writers like Ursula K. Le Guin and H. G. Wells, and theorists like Johannes Kepler and Albert Einstein. According to Stableford, the combined word count is 460,000 words, not including the 140,000-word index. The book consists of an introduction covering 7 pages, 575 pages of entries, a 12-page bibliography, and an index spanning 140 pages.

== Reception ==
Neil Barron reviewed the book for SFRA Review in 2006, presenting the book as an updated successor of sorts to the popular science book The Science in Science Fiction (1982)—which Stableford contributed to together with David Langford and Peter Nicholls—noting that Stableford says in the introduction to Science Fact and Science Fiction: An Encyclopedia that the older work used science fiction as the starting point to examine science whereas the newer work takes the opposite approach. Barron said "There is no book I know of which is a direct competitor to this encyclopedic study", writing that while the second edition of The Encyclopedia of Science Fiction (1993) by editors Peter Nicholls and John Clute far exceeds it in the number of entries, "they usually lack the analytical rigor and detail that Stableford provides". Barron praised the breadth of knowledge displayed by the contents of the entries and the lengthy bibliography.

Jack O'Gorman, reviewing the encyclopedia for Booklist in 2007, wrote that it "is not an encyclopedia of science fiction, and it's not an encyclopedia of science, either"; according to O'Gorman, it fills a niche that is not covered by other works such as Gary Westfahl's The Greenwood Encyclopedia of Science Fiction and Fantasy (2005) or Don D'Ammassa's Encyclopedia of Science Fiction (2005). O'Gorman found the book useful, and commended the decision to include works mentioned in the entries in the index.

Cindy Stewart Kaag wrote in Reference and User Services Quarterly in 2007 that the book is "a really good reference work on the science that makes it science fiction" and that the book does not have any counterparts in that respect. Kaag highlighted the navigability of the work as a positive, with entries listed alphabetically and thematically in addition to there being an extensive index, and commented that the bibliography at the end is comprehensive with works by scholars and science fiction writers alike. Kaag noted that the $165 price would likely make the book prohibitively expensive for many libraries.

Rob Latham, in a 2007 review in the Journal of the Fantastic in the Arts, compared the book favourably to The Encyclopedia of Science Fiction, writing that "Stableford's commentary has a wider cultural and philosophical resonance" as well as a greater level of detail. According to Latham, the book "entirely subsumes and supplants the few general works remotely like it" such as Rex Malik's Future Imperfect: Science Fact and Science Fiction (1980) and The Science in Science Fiction. Latham found the only negative thing to be said about the contents of the book to be the focus on "genre sf" to the exclusion of other subgenres at the periphery of science fiction, while noting that the high cost of the volume was also a drawback.

Joan Gordon, in her 2009 review of the work for Science Fiction Studies, said the book would be "a necessity, albeit an expensive one, for any library, public or personal, that strives for a strong collection on science fiction". She found the interconnectivity between entries, with words corresponding to entry titles marked by an asterisk, to provide a good way to explore related topics. Gordon also praised the entries themselves, both in terms of being informative and engaging to read. She found the example of one of her students using the book to illustrate its utility well: the student sought information on nuclear weapons in fiction and consulted the "Atom Bomb" entry, finding information among other things on the history of nuclear weapons, nuclear anxiety, and various relevant works of fiction across a wide range of time, with the possibility of locating additional relevant information in other entries or the bibliography. According to Gordon, "There is nothing else like it, but its presence makes clear that there should have been." Gordon nevertheless found several things about the book to criticize. She stated that while the introduction says that individuals were assigned entries due to "the relevance of their work to issues in science, rather than their importance within the history of genre science fiction", she did not find the selection of authors to reflect that criterion particularly well. She also perceived the book to have a strong male bias, noting for instance that the only woman with an individual entry in the book is Ursula K. Le Guin and identifying Marie Curie as a high-profile omission. Gordon further noted that the coverage of games is sparse.
