= Fantastic Cinema =

Fantastic Cinema (published in the US as The World of Fantastic Films: An Illustrated Survey) is a book by Peter Nicholls published in 1984.

== Plot summary ==
Fantastic Cinema is a book that explores the history of science fiction and fantasy films.

== Reception ==
Dave Langford reviewed Fantastic Cinema for White Dwarf #63, and stated that "Nicholls is eclectic and witty; he passes the important test of being interesting to read even when discussing films one has never seen and will probably never see".

== Reviews ==
- Review by Neil Barron (1985) in Fantasy Review, February 1985
- Review by Gene DeWeese (1985) in Science Fiction Review, Fall 1985
