= The Encyclopedia of Fantasy =

1997 book by John Clute and John Grant

- Cover of the first edition
- Authors: John Clute; John Grant
- Cover artist: Peter Goodfellow
- Language: English
- Subject: Fantasy
- Publisher: Orbit Books UK; St. Martin's Press US
- Publication date: 3 April 1997
- Publication place: United Kingdom
- Media type: Print (hardback and paperback), online
- Pages: 832 pp (first edition)
- ISBN: 978-1-85723-368-1
- OCLC: 37106061

The Encyclopedia of Fantasy is a 1997 reference work covering fantasy fiction, edited by John Clute and John Grant. As of November 2012, the full text of The Encyclopedia of Fantasy is available online, as a companion to the online edition of The Encyclopedia of Science Fiction. Other than adding death dates, there are no plans to update the encyclopaedia.

The book was well-received on publication, receiving the Hugo Award, World Fantasy Award, and Locus Award in 1998.

== Format and content ==
The Encyclopedia was published in a format that matches the 1993 second edition of The Encyclopedia of Science Fiction. It is slightly smaller in terms of content, containing 1,049 alphabetical pages, over 4,000 entries and approximately one million words, the bulk of which were written by Clute, Grant and Ashley. A later CD-ROM edition contains numerous revisions.

The Encyclopedia uses a similar system of categorisation to The Encyclopedia of Science Fiction, but does not include an index of theme entries. A theme index was later included in the online addenda. One of the major differences is that there are no entries related to publishing.

== Reception ==
Characterising the book as "an excellent and highly readable source for fantasy", the industry publication Library Journal described The Encyclopedia of Fantasy as "the first of its kind".

Rob Latham writing for Journal of the Fantastic in the Arts called it "a sprawling map of the field's major authors and texts and an extraordinary cohesive argument", "an indispensable work of reference" and "perhaps the most substantial critical analysis ever to focus on fantasy literature and art".

Lawrence Person reviewed it for Nova Express. The review examines the work together with Clute's related project, The Encyclopedia of Science Fiction. Person described Encyclopedia of Fantasy as addressing a broader, less defined genre, employing newly coined terms by Clute to categorize motifs, which may require readers to familiarize themselves with the terminology. Person also appreciates Clute's overarching theory of fantasy scattered across related entries. Person finds Encyclopedia of Fantasy more constrained than the other in the context of genre boundaries and market definitions. Some omissions include no entries on authors such as Neal Barrett Jr. and Shirley Jackson. Overall, the article recommends both encyclopedias as essential for serious scholars and enthusiasts of speculative fiction, emphasizing their value for research and casual reference despite minor flaws.

=== Awards ===
- 1998 – Hugo Award for Best Related Work
- 1998 – World Fantasy Special Award—Professional
- 1998 – Locus Award for Nonfiction

== Editions ==
- Clute, John and Grant, John. The Encyclopedia of Fantasy (1st UK edition). London: Orbit Books, 1997. ISBN 978-1-85723-368-1.
- Clute, John and Grant, John. The Encyclopedia of Fantasy. New York: St. Martin's Press, 1997. ISBN 0-312-15897-1.
- Clute, John and Grant, John. The Encyclopedia of Fantasy (2nd US edition). New York: St. Martin's Griffin, 1999. ISBN 0-312-19869-8.

== See also ==
- The Encyclopedia of Science Fiction
- The Encyclopedia of Science Fiction and Fantasy
- The Greenwood Encyclopedia of Science Fiction and Fantasy
