= The Science in Science Fiction =

1982 book by David Langford

- Author: David Langford; Peter Nicholls; Brian Stableford
- Language: English
- Publication date: 1982

The Science in Science Fiction is a book by David Langford, Peter Nicholls and Brian Stableford published in 1982. The book is divided into twelve chapters. The first eleven chapters each examine science fiction works about a particular topic, such as Space Flight, Aliens or Time Travel, and discuss how accurate the works are to real science; the final chapter of the book covers notable instances "where science fiction gets it wrong".

== Reception ==
Dave Pringle, the former editor of Foundation and Interzone, reviewed the book for Imagine magazine in April 1983, describing it as "an excellent and timely work of non-fiction," and stated he hopes "every would-be SF writer in the land reads this book and comes to the realisation that raw imagination and an ability with words are not enough; a modicum of knowledge has always been necessary to the creation of worthwhile science-fiction."

Science fiction author Gene DeWeese reviewed the book for Science Fiction Review in May 1983, recommending the book to any science fiction reader who wants to know if the events depicted could actually happen. His review was mostly positive, particularly complimenting the book's "clear and interesting prose" and its illustrations, although he criticized David Langford for coming across as condescending and "fail[ing] to distinguish between authors who made silly mistakes because of ignorance and those who purposely violated current scientific theories."

== Reviews ==
- Review by Gregory Benford (1983) in Locus, #267 April 1983
- Review by Patrick Parrinder (1983) in Science Fiction & Fantasy Book Review, #11, January-February 1983
- Review by Neil Barron (1983) in Science Fiction & Fantasy Book Review, #11, January-February 1983
- Review by Ken Methold (1983) in Omega Science Digest, September-October 1983
- Review by Duncan Lunan (1983) in The Bulletin of the Science Fiction Writers of America, Fall 1983
- Review [German] by Uwe Anton (1984) in Science Fiction Times, Januar 1984
- Review by Andrew C. Murdoch (1993) in ZX, July-August 1993
