= Brian Ash (bibliographer) =

British writer, journalist, and editor (1936–2010)

Brian Ash (1936 – 30 June 2010) was a British writer, scientific journalist, and editor. Ash was best known for his bibliographies and reference books. In the 1970s he wrote several works on science fiction, including Faces of the Future, Who's Who in Science Fiction, and Who's Who in H. G. Wells. He also was the editor of The Visual Encyclopedia of Science Fiction (1977: UK, Pan Books; US, Harmony/Crown Books, ISBN 0-517-53175-5), which contained chapter introductions from science fiction authors as well as articles on the themes of science fiction written by himself and others. The latter title was, in 1978, listed as one of the ALA Best Books for Young Adults. He was married once, and had two children.

In the field of advertising, Ash published Tiger in your Tank: the Anatomy of an Advertising Campaign, a light-hearted study of the worldwide ESSO "Tiger in your Tank" campaign.

== Bibliography ==
- Tiger in Your Tank: The Anatomy of an Advertising Campaign (1969)
- Faces of the Future: The Lessons of Science Fiction (1975)
- Who's Who in Science Fiction (1976)
- The Visual Encyclopedia of Science Fiction (1977)
- Who's Who in H. G. Wells (1979)

== Bibliography ==
- Clute, John and Peter Nicholls. The Encyclopedia of Science Fiction. New York: St. Martin's Griffin, 1995. ISBN 0-312-13486-X.
- Katz, Bill and Ruth A. Fraley. Reference Services for Children and Young Adults. New York: The Haworth Press, Inc., 1983. ISBN 0-86656-201-X.
