= The Visual Encyclopedia of Science Fiction =

1977 book edited by Brian Ash

The Encyclopedia of Science Fiction
- Cover of the first edition
- Author: Brian Ash
- Cover artist: Tim White
- Language: English
- Subject: Science fiction
- Publisher: Pan Books
- Publication date: 1977
- Media type: Print (hardcover and paperback)
- ISBN: 978-0517531754

The Visual Encyclopedia of Science Fiction is an illustrated collection of bibliographic essays on the history and subject matter of science fiction. It was edited by Brian Ash and published in 1977 by Pan Books in the UK and Harmony/Crown Books in the US.

== Summary ==
The book starts with a parallel chronology of significant events in the fields of science fiction stories, magazines, novels, movies/TV/radio, and fandom, from 1805 to 1976. The book's thematic sections contain introductions by science fiction authors, and extensive bibliographies of science fiction works featuring each theme. It includes extended essays on science fiction, called "Deep Probes". The chapters are numbered in the style of a technical manual. Illustrations are primarily book and magazine covers, and interior illustrations from magazines, including a number of illustrations by Virgil Finlay, among others. The anthologist and editor Mike Ashley are credited in the book as "Principal Research Consultant".

== Reception ==
The book earned favorable reviews from the American Library Association and other organizations that specialize in children's reading. Reviews from the field of science fiction were less enthusiastic:

A handsome volume, illustrated in colour, it did not work well as a reference work for people interested in particular writers, and was widely regarded as a "coffee-table" book.

— Peter Nicholls, "Brian Ash" in The Encyclopedia of Science Fiction

The Visual Encyclopedia is a thoroughly superficial work, but with such values of convenience that even a superficial reference work can have.

— R.D. Mullen, Science Fiction Studies #15, Vol. 5, Part 2, July 1978

== See also ==
- The Encyclopedia of Fantasy
- The Encyclopedia of Science Fiction
- The Greenwood Encyclopedia of Science Fiction and Fantasy
