= Science-Fiction: The Early Years =

Book by Everett F. Bleiler

- Author: Everett F. Bleiler, Richard Bleiler
- Language: English
- Subject: Science fiction
- Genre: Reference book
- Publisher: Kent State University Press
- Publication date: 12 December 1990
- Publication place: United States
- Pages: 1024
- Awards: Locus Award for Best Non-Fiction
- ISBN: 0-87338-416-4
- Preceded by: The Guide to Supernatural Fiction (1983)
- Followed by: Science-Fiction: The Gernsback Years (1998)

Science-Fiction: The Early Years is an American reference book on early science fiction of all countries up until 1930, published by Kent State University Press. The book catalogues over 3000 science fiction works, many of which are very rare and have never been described before. The included works are novels, novelettes, short stories and occasional plays. Several indexes are included: motif and theme index, date index, magazine index, title index and author index. The book received the Locus Award for Best Non-Fiction in 1992.

The book's foreword acknowledges the difficulty of selecting both the initial and terminal date; the authors regard Johannes Kepler's Somnium (1634) as the first story "that could indisputably be called science-fiction". The year 1930 was chosen as the least objectionable of several possible terminal dates, being the point at which genre magazines became widely available in the United States. The book's catalogue is not regarded as complete, as at least two unimportant omissions have been noted (Garret Smith's "You've Killed Privacy!" and Donn Byrne's "Through 'HELL' to Peace").

== Reception ==
John Clute, writing in The Encyclopedia of Science Fiction, commented that Bleiler's suite of reference works consisting of The Guide to Supernatural Fiction (1983), Science-Fiction: The Early Years (1990), and Science-Fiction: The Gernsback Years (1998) "stands as a central resource for the study of sf books" alongside the works of authors such as Neil Barron (author of Anatomy of Wonder) and Donald H. Tuck (author of The Encyclopedia of Science Fiction and Fantasy). Clute also wrote that all three works are characterized both by extraordinary scope and extraordinary thoroughness.

The book won the Locus Award for Best Non-fiction in 1992.

== See also ==
- Science-Fiction: The Gernsback Years (1998)
