= The Greenwood Encyclopedia of Science Fiction and Fantasy =

2005 English-language reference work on science fiction and fantasy

- Editors: Gary Westfahl
- Language: English
- Subject: Fantasy
- Publisher: Greenwood Publishing Group
- Publication date: 2005
- Publication place: United States
- Media type: Print
- Pages: 1395 + xxix (3 volumes)
- ISBN: 978-0-313-32950-0
- OCLC: 60401685

The Greenwood Encyclopedia of Science Fiction and Fantasy: Themes, Works, and Wonders is an English language reference work on science fiction and fantasy, published in 2005 by Greenwood Publishing Group. It was edited by Gary Westfahl and consists of three volumes of 200 entries each. The first two volumes contain entries organized by themes, such as "Aliens in Space", "Asia" or "Rats and Mice", while the third volume lists works such as novels and films which are considered defining for the science fiction and fantasy genres.

The reviews of the work were mixed, with most reviewers finding this encyclopedia to be a commendable effort, but criticizing the work for being not comprehensive enough yet overpriced (at $349.95).

== Contents ==
The scope of The Greenwood Encyclopedia of Science Fiction and Fantasy was defined early on as 600 entries written by a number of different authors, ranging from established specialists to doctoral students. It consists of three volumes of 200 entries each, with the first two containing entries on themes, and the last one focusing on selected novels, films, and television series. Each entry is about 800 words long. Themes range from expected "Aliens in Space" or "Dragons", less expected ones such as "Food and Drink" or "Rats and Mice", to ones criticized by some reviewers as likely unnecessary, such as "Christmas" or "Eschatology".

== Reception ==
Shortly after its release, in 2005, Donald M. Hassler reviewed The Greenwood Encyclopedia of Science Fiction and Fantasy for Extrapolation. He praised the aesthetics of the work, noting that the set is "beautifully bound in boards that look like pulp magazine covers". He found the volumes "useful and fun" but also "idiosyncratic" when it comes to the selection of the topics, concluding that despite professed consultation with other experts over the contents "certain themes rather than others have haunted Westfahl himself". He observed that the last volume, focusing on works, seems to be biased towards 19th century classics, noting the omission of entries on more recent works such as Dhalgren, Mission of Gravity, The End of Eternity, or The Gods Themselves. With the acknowledgement that the editors subjective tastes significantly influenced the selection of topics, he concluded that the work is one of the "stars in the expanding university of science fiction studies".

Aaron Parrett, reviewing this work for the Science Fiction Studies in 2006, suggested that it is too limited in scope, and "reflects the idiosyncratic state" of its editor, criticizing the choice of the term encyclopedia in the book's name as misleading. He blamed Greenwood's editorial board for "thwarting a solid survey of a literary field" by limiting this project to 600 entries, particularly given that the book already combines two genres (science fiction and fantasy). With regards to the actual contents, he further criticized the work as lacking many entries he perceives as crucial (ex. Amazing Stories, Astounding Stories. Galaxy Science Fiction, Jurassic Park, Minority Report, THX 1138, Twin Peaks), while having unnecessary entries on topics such as "Christianity" or "Christmas". For the existing entries he argues many are likewise not comprehensive, for example pointing out that the entry on The Simpsons fails to mention the show's resident space aliens, Kang and Kodos. He further observed that the book is mostly focused on fantasy, rather than science fiction, and calls the entire project a "sampler" of the relevant literary canon rather than a proper encyclopedia. He did note that "there is plenty here to enjoy and appreciate", highlighting a number of "delightful" entries, and concluded by resigning himself to the fact that by default, any encyclopedic project "that aims for anything less [than everything] will be inevitably limited in scope".

Will Slocombe, reviewing this encyclopedia for English the same year, wrote that the project is too ambitious for its limited size, and pointed out that the allocation of roughly the same word count to all entries is not fair for more complex topics (comparing, for example, entries on "Aliens in Space" to "Rats and Mice"), which therefore often fail "to deliver enough depth". Along those lines, he observed that the editorial choice not to have entries on authors, while justifiable, further reinforces the lack of comprehensiveness visible this encyclopedia. He nonetheless acknowledged that "the general quality of the entries is good", and in particular praised "the geographically-themed articles" about different parts of the world, such as "Asia" or "South Pacific", as well as those on niche topics, such as the "Rats and Mice", although he also cautioned that their inclusion can make the work "too ephemeral" on occasion. He concluded that the cost of the work is also likely too prohibitive for most readers, but found the work a "useful inclusion in a library reference section", calling the work "not entirely successful but... an interesting and engaging attempt".

Also in 2006, Keith M.C. O'Sullivan reviewed the work for the Reference Reviews. He observed that as a result of trying to cover both science fiction and fantasy genres, the encyclopedia is "a little overreaching". He found the overall organization of this work "quite impressive", although he found the lack of consistency between entries by different authors unfortunate, if expected. The entries themselves he found generally "well researched", although he also noted that there are occasional "surprising oversights", and several weaker entries do little but summarize the plot of the works described. He observed that unfortunately due the space and organizational limits, some shorter but nonetheless important works have been omitted from the 200 entries of canon; here he lists omissions such as The Stone Tape, I Sing the Body Electric, Comical History of the States and Empires of the Moon, Being John Malkovich, and the entirety of works of H. P. Lovecraft. He concluded that the "hefty price" of the work makes the work unlikely to be of use to individual readers outside of libraries, and ended by writing that "with many reservations, it is a brave, well-researched and substantial endeavour, and a useful if not perfect reference tool".

Steven J. Corvi reviewing the Greenwood Encyclopedia for The Journal of Popular Culture in 2007 likewise noted the book is overpriced (at $349.95) and therefore is not likely to be easily accessible to most casual readers. Second, he criticized the work's "cumbersome organization", noting that as expected from this type of work with a multitude of co-authors, "entries vary in usefulness and quality". Additionally, he observed that the work also misses some "essential" entries, particularly in the realm of influential films. Nonetheless, he concluded that "these faults do not offset the usefulness of this work", and that it is "an essential tool for students writing thematic essays", and teachers planning relevant lessons. He also noted that the very existence of this encyclopedia can help "create an intellectual legitimacy" for those genres.

The most common criticism that most reviewers independently noted is that many entries introduce topics – themes, works, people (ex. Chinua Achebe) – that seem important and that the readers may want to research further, but that are just mentioned in passing and have no independent entries.

== See also ==
- The Visual Encyclopedia of Science Fiction (1977), edited by Brian Ash
- Encyclopedia of Science Fiction (1978), edited by Robert Holdstock
- The Encyclopedia of Science Fiction (SFE) (1979), edited by Pete Nicholls and John Clute
- Science Fiction Literature Through History: An Encyclopedia (2021) by Westfahl
