= Richard Bleiler =

American science fiction bibliographer and librarian

- Born: Richard James Bleiler; 1959 (age 66–67); United States
- Occupations: Librarian, writer
- Writing career
- Language: English
- Genre: Bibliography

Richard James Bleiler (born 1959) is an American bibliographer of science fiction, fantasy, horror, crime, and adventure fiction. He was nominated for the Bram Stoker Award for Best Non-Fiction in 2002 and for the Munsey Award in 2019–2022. He won the 2023 Munsey Award, given to “an individual or organization that has bettered the pulp community.” He is the son of bibliographer and publisher Everett F. Bleiler.

Bleiler was appointed reference librarian and selector for the humanities at the University of Connecticut's Homer Babbidge Library in 1994. As of 2024 he serves as the Collections and Humanities Librarian.

== Bibliography ==
=== Books ===
- The Index to Adventure Magazine. 2 vols. Starmont House, 1990.
- Science-Fiction: The Early Years (with Everett F. Bleiler). Kent State University Press, 1990.
- The Annotated Index to The Thrill Book. Borgo Press, 1991.
- Science-Fiction: The Gernsback Years (with Everett F. Bleiler). Kent State University Press, 1998.
- Science Fiction Writers: Critical Studies of the Major Authors from the Early Nineteenth Century to the President Day (2nd ed.). Scribner's, 1999.
- Reference Guide to Mystery and Detective Fiction. Libraries Unlimited, 1999.
- Supernatural Fiction Writers: Contemporary Fantasy and Horror. 2nd ed. Charles Scribner's Sons, 2003.
- Reference and Research Guide to Mystery and Detective Fiction. Libraries Unlimited, 2004.
- Ed., Political Future Fiction: Speculative and Counter-Factual Politics in Edwardian Fiction - Empire of the Future. Vol. 1. Pickering & Chatto, 2013.
- The Strange Case of the Angels of Mons: Arthur Machen's World War I Story, the Insistent Believers, and His Refutations. McFarland, 2015.
