= The Encyclopedia of Science Fiction =

English language reference work

- Cover of the first edition
- Editor: Peter Nicholls, John Clute; David Langford from 2011
- Language: English
- Subject: Science fiction
- Publisher: Granada, 1979; St. Martin's Press, 1993, 1995; Orbit Books, 1993, 1999; McFarland & Company, 2017
- Publication place: United Kingdom
- Media type: Print (1979, 1993, 1995, 1999); CD-ROM (1995); Online (2011, 2017)
- Pages: 672 pp, 1979; 1370 pp, 1993; 1386 pp, 1995; 1396 pp, 1999; 1636 pp, 2017
- ISBN: 978-0246110206
- OCLC: 10600614
- Dewey Decimal: 809.3876203
- LC Class: PN3433.4

The Encyclopedia of Science Fiction (SFE) is an English-language reference work devoted to science fiction, first published in 1979 under the editorship of Peter Nicholls and John Clute. It covers science-fiction authors, themes, terminology, films, television, magazines, comics, awards, and related topics.

The encyclopedia has appeared in four major editions. The first edition was published in 1979, followed by a substantially expanded second edition in 1993 and a CD-ROM version in 1995. A third edition was launched online in 2011 under the editorship of Clute, David Langford, Nicholls, and Graham Sleight, transforming the work into a continuously updated digital resource. Following a change of web host, a fourth edition was released in 2021. Since its first edition, the encyclopedia has grown from approximately 2,800 to more than 20,000 entries, with its online version totaling over seven million words.

The Encyclopedia of Science Fiction has received positive responses from critics, who have praised its breadth and usefulness as a reference work since its inception. It has won multiple major genre awards, including the Hugo Award, Locus Award, and BSFA Award, and has been credited with helping to establish standards for science-fiction scholarship.

== Contents ==
The Encyclopedia of Science Fiction contains entries under the categories of themes, terminology, science fiction in various countries, films, television, magazines, fanzines, comics, original anthologies, awards, and miscellaneous, as well as people (authors, filmmakers, illustrators, publishers, and others). The encyclopedia, however, does not include entries on individual books. Most releases include various multimedia content; the 4th edition, as of February 2026, had over 35,000 images (mostly book covers).

Early on, the editors decided that the encyclopedia would be organized as a single alphabetical sequence rather than divided into separate sections, with cross-references linking related topics throughout the work. This emphasis on internal linking remained a defining feature of later editions and became more fully realized via hyperlinks after the encyclopedia moved online in 2011.

The online edition of The Encyclopedia of Science Fiction was released in October 2011 with 12,230 entries, totaling 3,200,000 words. The editors predicted that it would contain 4,000,000 words upon completion of the first round of updates at the end of 2012; this figure was actually reached in January 2013, and 5,000,000 words in November 2015. Though the SFE is a collaborative work with numerous contributors, John Clute and David Langford were its principal editors, with Clute identified as its most prolific contributor. Peter Nicholls, the encyclopedia's founding editor, also contributed to the Third Edition, although on a smaller scale. As of February 2026, the site contained 20,868 entries totalling 7,532,364 words.

== History ==
=== Origins ===
The encyclopedia originated in around 1975, when Peter Nicholls was approached by publisher Hugh Elwes of Roxby Press about creating a reference work devoted to science fiction. After agreeing to the proposal, Nicholls developed the encyclopedia's editorial structure with John Clute and other early contributors before publication arrangements were made with Granada in the United Kingdom and Doubleday in the United States, culminating in the publication of the first edition in 1979.

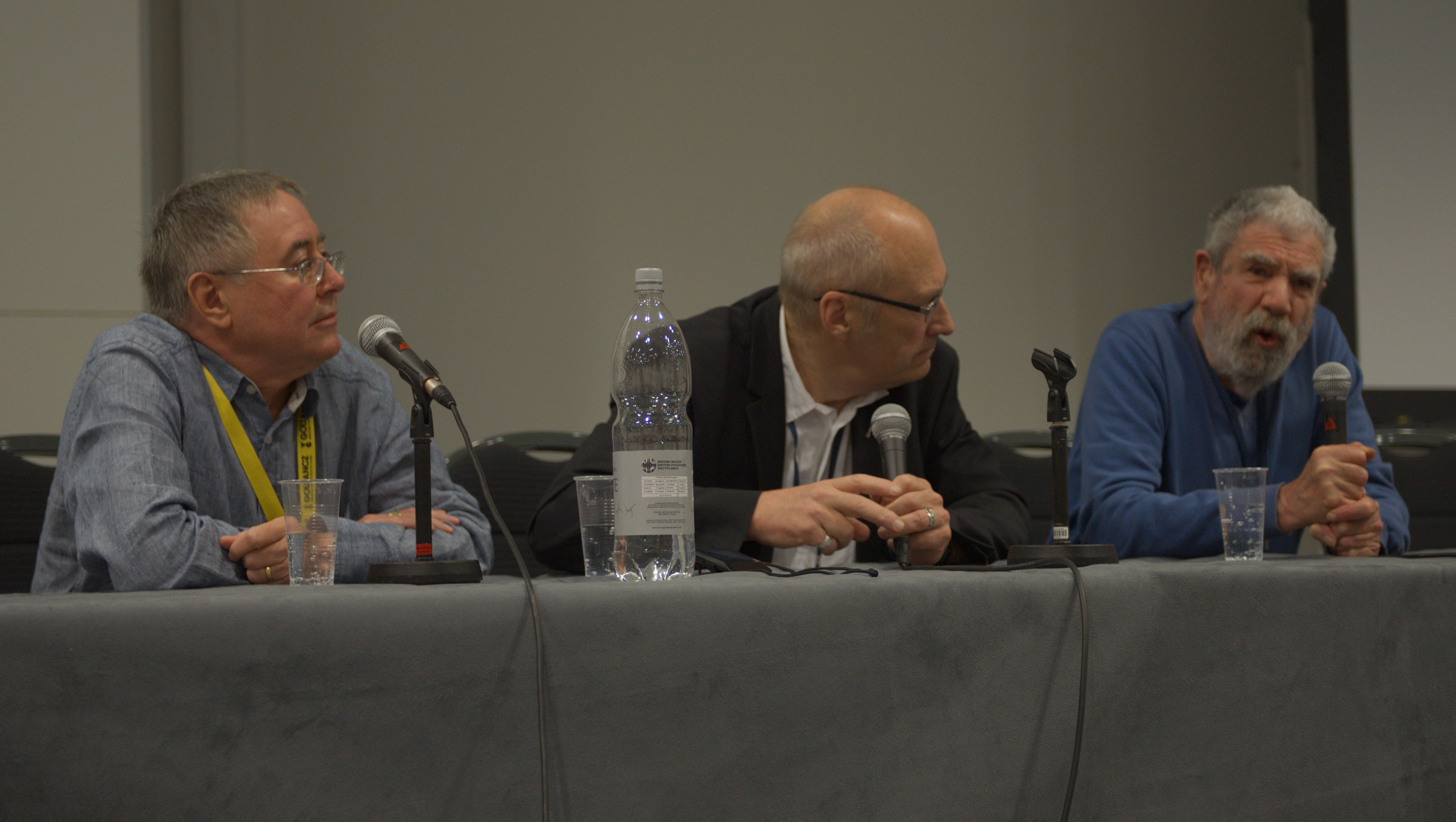
Malcolm Edwards, John Clute and Peter Nicholls discussing the early days of The Encyclopedia of Science Fiction at Loncon 3, Worldcon 2014

=== First edition ===
The first edition, edited by Nicholls with Clute, was published by Granada in 1979. It was retitled The Science Fiction Encyclopedia when published by Doubleday in the United States. Accompanying its text were numerous black and white photographs illustrating authors, book and magazine covers, film and TV stills, and examples of artists' work. It had about 2,800 entries. Contributing editors included Malcolm Edwards and Brian Stableford, while contributors included John Brosnan.

=== Second edition ===
A second edition, jointly edited by Nicholls and Clute, was published in 1993 by Orbit in the UK and St. Martin's Press in the US. The second edition contained 1.3 million words, almost twice the 700,000 words of the 1979 edition. The number of entries grew to over 4,300. The 1995 and 1999 paperback editions included an appendix listing corrections and addenda. Unlike the first edition, the print versions did not contain illustrations.

There was also a CD-ROM version in 1995, styled variously as The Multimedia Encyclopedia of Science Fiction (MESF) and Grolier Science Fiction. This contained text updates through 1995, hundreds of book covers and author photos, a small number of old film trailers, and author video clips (from the TV series Prisoners of Gravity and E-scape Velocity).

The companion volume, published after the second print edition and following its format closely, is The Encyclopedia of Fantasy edited by John Clute and John Grant. A small number of entries overlap between the two volumes; however, The Encyclopedia of Fantasy, while also available online, is not being updated.

=== Third edition ===
By the early twenty-first century, the editors concluded that further expansion in book form was no longer practical, leading to the development of an online third edition. Development of the online edition began in earnest in 2005, using a corrected and expanded version of the 1995 CD-ROM text as its foundation.

The third edition was launched in October 2011 by SFE Ltd (Science Fiction Encyclopedia Ltd) in association with Victor Gollancz Ltd and the SF Gateway project. The encyclopedia website's October 2011 launch date was chosen to coincide with the debut of SF Gateway as part of Gollancz's fiftieth-anniversary celebrations, at the insistence of publisher Malcolm Edwards.

Compared to the second edition (CD-ROM version), the editors extensively revised and expanded the text, increasing it from about 1.4 million words and 6,700 entries to more than 3.2 million words and 12,000 entries at launch. A gallery of 10,000 images (mostly book covers) was added in May 2013. The editorial team consisted of John Clute, David Langford, Graham Sleight, and Peter Nicholls, the latter serving as editor emeritus until his death in 2018.

Unlike the earlier print editions, the third edition was conceived as a continuously updated reference work, with the editors emphasizing that the encyclopedia would remain a work in progress. Since its launch in that format, the encyclopedia has been updated regularly (usually several times a week) by the editorial team with material written by themselves and contributed by science fiction academics and experts.

=== Fourth edition ===
Although in the 2010s SFE was initially closely linked to the SF Gateway project, the relationship weakened after Edwards left and SF Gateway was redesigned. The Encyclopedia ended its arrangement with Gollancz in September 2021 and moved to a new, self-owned web server, resulting in the launch of the fourth edition in October of that year. While based on the earlier design, the new edition incorporates a number of revisions; for instance, many author entries now include thumbnails of the author's book covers. Meanwhile, SFE Ltd closed in 2024, with the encyclopedia published since by small press Ansible Editions.

According to the editors of the encyclopedia, the distinction between the third and fourth editions is primarily technical (regarding the legal aspects of the publishing entity) and not regarded as of great importance.

== Reception ==
=== First edition ===
The first edition's publication received "universal praise" from critics upon its release according to writer Bruce Gillespie. Writer Ian Watson reviewed the first edition in 1980 for the journal Foundation. Watson stated that the "volume is a genuine encyclopedia – the first such. It is the Britannica of the sf field", positively commenting on the breadth and scope of its entries. Watson noted only a small number of errors, which he felt were easily fixable in a possible second edition. Gillespie, writing in Australian fanzine SF Commentary highlighted the book's comprehensiveness, though similarly noted some missing notable entries. Both critics characterized the book as expensive, but stated the amount of content made up for it. Thomas Easton regarded it as a "standard" for reference works in the field until the publication of its second edition.

Writer Damien Broderick would later note in a review of the second edition that a major failing of its first edition was the lack of female scholars, with the section discussing female science fiction instead being written by Nicholls rather than by a woman. Critic John Kessel also stated in his review of the second edition that many readers complained about a perceived British or "New Wave" bias in its entries, though Kessel wrote that others saw that as a strength of the first edition. Writing in Black Gate in 2019, Steven H. Silver highlighted the usage of images in the first edition, which he felt was lacking in later installments, though noted that due to the introduction of subsequent editions of the encyclopedia, the first edition had largely become a "curiosity" overall.

=== Second edition ===
The second edition was widely anticipated in the Anglophone SF community. Writing for Locus, Christopher Fowler noted that the encyclopedia's launch event at Eastercon and subsequent book signing were well attended, and reported that the volume had already sold out at specialist bookstores in London. The second edition received positive reviews from critics, who praised its value as a reference work. Reviewers particularly praised the encyclopedia's greatly expanded scope compared to the first edition, highlighting its sheer breadth of coverage and interesting and educational content. Reviewing it for Foundation, Edward James called it "the one indispensable volume on every sf readers' shelf", while Gary Westfahl in Extrapolation described it as "the one essential reference book for anyone interested in science fiction" and predicted it would become heavily cited in future science fiction studies scholarship. Gary K. Wolfe, writing for Locus, saw it as a work that defined the genre at the end of the twentieth century, and Stephen P. Brown in Science Fiction Eye opined that it was "the single most important book ever published in the SF field".

Broderick praised its success in bridging academic criticism and popular science-fiction culture, appreciating the conversational yet rigorous tone that bridged academic and fan perspectives while Brown highlighted its hyperlinked, cross-referential structure and Kessel singled out its 212 essays on themes as a particularly valuable feature. A recurring topic in reviews was the encyclopedia's distinctive editorial voice. Critics praised the writing for being opinionated while being engaging and avoiding being biased in its opinions. Edward James, however, criticized what he perceived as the "sneering" tone of some film entries. Kessel noted that, despite some debatable opinions, the treatment of authors was generally fair and professionally balanced, though stated that there was homogeneity in the authors' voices, as well as visible biases, in the essays section. Wolfe also identified a number of flaws in the "Themes" essays, noting that while entries on common motifs were well written and easy to reference, many were listed under obscure titles or had topics that were incredibly obscure or narrow in focus. Darrell Schweitzer stated that, despite including a few errors, the encyclopedia's overall usefulness as a reference work rendered those few errors a negligible issue.

Wolfe, alongside Broderick, noted the improved coverage of female authors, though Wolfe stated that entries on black or gay science-fiction authors were still lacking. Several critics noted odd exclusions in the book, with critic Stephen Brown stating that the rigid inclusion criteria of requiring a published novel excluded prominent authors and included considerably more obscure ones. Lawrence Person similarly noted a perceived bias for British-produced media, which was included more than other countries' productions. Norman Spinrad also felt as though the book struggled to properly define what counted as "science fiction", resulting in inconsistent inclusion criteria, with Kessel also noting that the inclusion of films and authors only tangentially related to science fiction was questionable. Thomas Easton, however, wrote that while "this book could probably be more than it is", he felt that the book was as comprehensive as it could be while still fitting in one volume.

==== CD-ROM edition ====
The CD-ROM edition was reviewed by Fiona Kelleghan for Science Fiction Studies, Russell Letson for Locus, and Moshe Feder for Asimov's Science Fiction. The reviewers found the underlying core text useful, but found the added multimedia elements (video clips, images, etc.) largely superficial and disappointing compared to the strength of the core reference text. Kelleghan appreciated the introduction of video trailers for various science fiction films in the multimedia, though felt, like many users of the encyclopedia, that there could be more added. She also took note of an issue with "A", "An", and "The" being indexed in search results, which most library catalogue systems do not contain; she felt this could be confusing for readers. Letson found the CD-ROM version to have some factual inaccuracies in some of its writing, and that much of its content was lacking compared to the print version, recommending the print version over the CD-ROM version if buyers had a choice. Feder, however, noted that it was easy to get lost in reading due to the inclusion of hyperlinks to other articles in the CD-ROM version, preferring it to the book, which Feder saw as better as a reference text than for general reading.

=== Third edition ===
Reviewing the beta version in 2012 for Choice Reviews Online, Robert A. Aken noted that although the encyclopedia was not yet complete, it was easy to access, up to date, and remarkably free of errors, concluding that "no print or online work approaches this resource's coverage" and recommending it for both students and researchers. Reviewing the encyclopedia for Reference Reviews in 2013, Waudenna Agee highlighted its vast scope, extensive hyperlinking, frequent updates, advanced search tools, and user-friendly design, describing it as a comprehensive and authoritative resource whose transition from print and CD-ROM editions to an online database had enhanced its usefulness and reliability.

== Awards ==
Edition	Awards
1st ed. (1979)	Hugo Award for Best Non-Fiction Book; Locus Award for Best Related Non-Fiction
2nd ed. (1993)	Hugo Award for Best Non-Fiction Book; Locus Award for Best Non-Fiction; BSFA Award (Special Award)
3rd ed. (2011)	Hugo Award for Best Related Work; BSFA Award for Best Non-Fiction; European Science Fiction Society Award for Best Promotion of the Genre

== Publications ==
- First edition:
  - Nicholls, Peter, ed. (1979). The Encyclopedia of Science Fiction: An Illustrated A to Z. St Albans, Herts, UK: Granada Publishing Ltd. ISBN 978-0-246-11020-6.
- Second edition:
  - Clute, John; Nicholls, Peter, eds. (1993). The Encyclopedia of Science Fiction (2nd ed.). London: Orbit Books. ISBN 978-1-85723-124-3. xxxvi + 1370 pp.
  - Clute, John; Nicholls, Peter, eds. (1995). The Encyclopedia of Science Fiction (2nd ed.). New York: St. Martin's Press. ISBN 978-0-312-13486-0. xxxvi + 1386 pp.
  - Clute, John; Nicholls, Peter, eds. (1995). The Multimedia Encyclopedia of Science Fiction (CD-ROM) (2nd ed.). Danbury, CT: Grolier Science Fiction. ISBN 978-0-7172-3999-3.
  - Clute, John; Nicholls, Peter, eds. (1999). The Encyclopedia of Science Fiction (2nd ed.). London: Orbit Books. ISBN 978-1-85723-897-6. xxxvi + 1396 pp.
- Third edition:
  - Clute, John; Langford, David; Nicholls, Peter; Sleight, Graham, eds. (2011). The Encyclopedia of Science Fiction (3rd ed.). London: Gollancz. Archived from the original on 19 December 2011.
- Fourth edition:
  - Clute, John; Langford, David, eds. (2021). The Encyclopedia of Science Fiction (4th ed.). London and Reading: SFE Ltd and Ansible Editions.

== See also ==
- Science-Fiction: The Early Years
- The Encyclopedia of Fantasy
- Encyclopedia of Science Fiction (1978 book)
- The Greenwood Encyclopedia of Science Fiction and Fantasy
- The Visual Encyclopedia of Science Fiction
