= Peter Nicholls (writer) =

Australian literary scholar and critic (1939–2018)

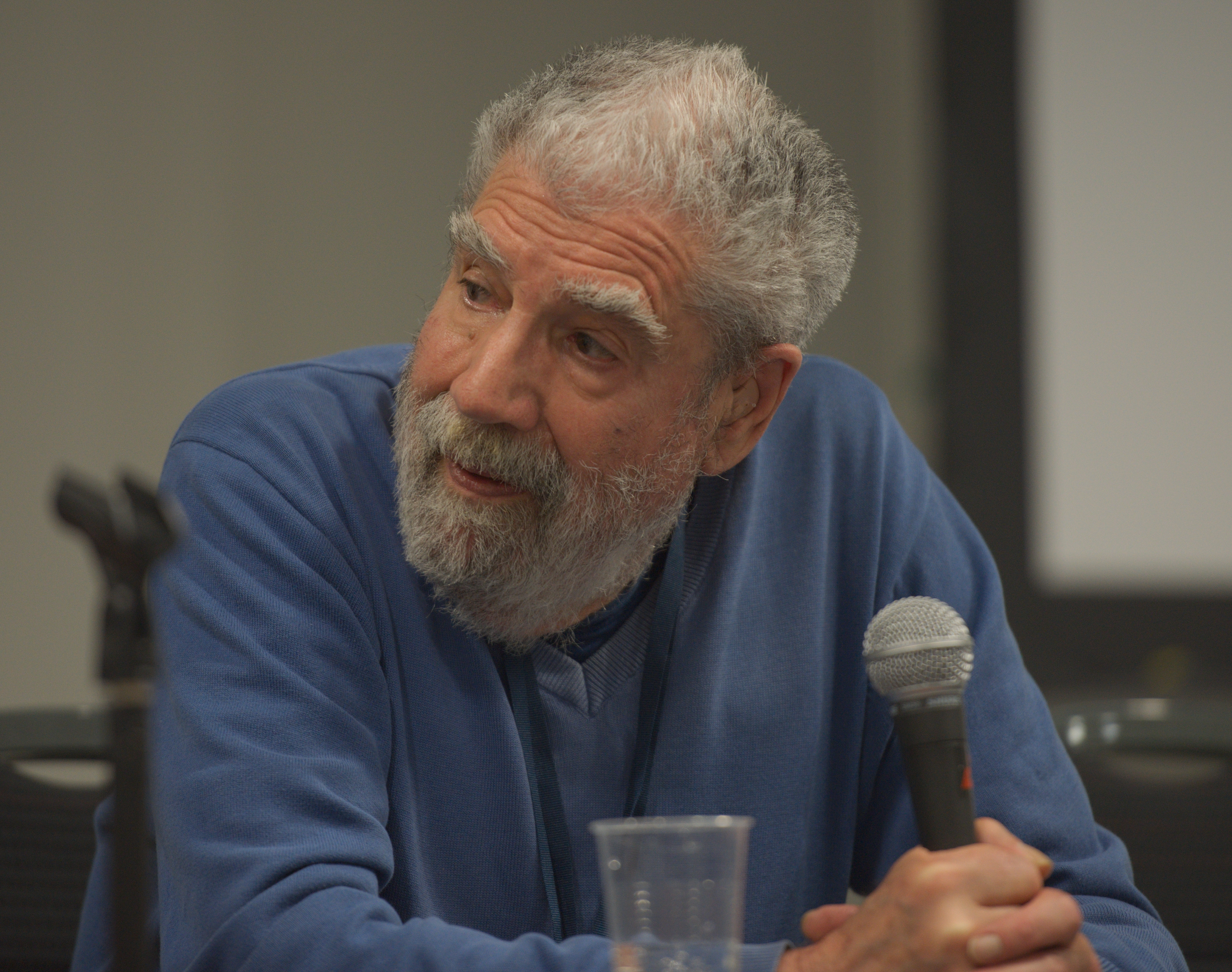
- Nicholls on a 2014 Worldcon panel discussing The Encyclopedia of Science Fiction
- Born: Peter Douglas Nicholls; 8 March 1939; Melbourne, Victoria, Australia
- Died: 6 March 2018 (aged 78); Melbourne, Victoria, Australia
- Occupations: Literary scholar, critic, writer
- Children: Sophie Cunningham
- Writing career
- Language: English
- Genre: Science fiction

Peter Douglas Nicholls (8 March 1939 – 6 March 2018) was an Australian literary scholar and critic. He was the creator and a co-editor of The Encyclopedia of Science Fiction with John Clute.

== Early career ==
Born in Australia's state of Victoria in Melbourne, he spent two decades from 1968 to 1988 as an expatriate, first in the USA, and then the UK.

Nicholls' early career was as a literary academic, originally with the University of Melbourne. He first travelled to the USA in 1968 with a Harkness Fellowship in movie making, and has scripted television documentaries. His significant contributions to science fiction scholarship and criticism began during 1971, when he became the first Administrator of the Science Fiction Foundation (UK), a title he had until 1977. He was editor of its journal, Foundation: The Review of Science Fiction, from 1974 to 1978.

== The Encyclopedia of Science Fiction ==
During 1979, Nicholls edited The Encyclopedia of Science Fiction (published in the USA as The Science Fiction Encyclopedia), with John Clute as associate editor.

Most of its 730,000 words were written by Nicholls, Clute and two contributing editors. It won the 1980 Hugo Award for the Nonfiction Book category.

A completely revised, updated, and greatly expanded version of the Encyclopedia, co-edited with Clute, was published in 1993, and won the 1994 Hugo for the same category. A further updating of the work, with revisions and corrections, was later issued in CD-ROM format. The third edition, with Clute and David Langford, was released online as a beta text in October 2011.

== Other work ==
Nicholls' other major publications include: Science Fiction At Large (1976; reprinted 1978 with the title Explorations of the Marvellous), a collection of essays edited by Nicholls from a 1975 symposium; The Science in Science Fiction (1983) edited by Nicholls and written by him with David Langford and Brian Stableford; and Fantastic Cinema (1984; published in the USA as The World of Fantastic Films). Genre Fiction: The Roaring Years (2022) is a posthumous collection of his reviews and essays which he had planned, titled and written an introduction for circa 2012 but was unable to complete.

He won several awards for his scholarship, including the Science Fiction Research Association's Pilgrim Award (1980), an Eaton Award (1995) and a Peter McNamara Award (2006). He broadcast movie and book reviews on BBC Radio from 1974 and worked as a publisher's editor 1982–1983.

Nicholls was diagnosed with Parkinson's disease during 2000, which gradually curtailed his activities. A movie about his interest and work in science fiction, titled The What-If Man, was completed in 2004.

== Personal life ==
Nicholls was the father of five children. His daughter is author and editor Sophie Cunningham. He lived in Melbourne with his wife, Clare Coney, where he died on 6 March 2018 at the age of 78.
