= Gary Westfahl =

American writer (born 1951)

- Born: May 7, 1951 (age 75); Washington, D.C., United States
- Education: Claremont University
- Occupations: Writer and reviewer
- Writing career
- Subject: Science fiction

Gary Wesley Westfahl (born May 7, 1951) is an American writer and scholar of science fiction. He has written reviews for the Los Angeles Times, The Internet Review of Science Fiction and Locus Online. He worked at the University of California, Riverside until 2011 and is now a Professor Emeritus at the University of La Verne.

== Work ==
In his essay "For Tomorrow We Dine: The Sad Gourmet at the Scienticafe", Westfahl, co-editor of "Foods of the Gods: Eating and the Eaten in Fantasy and Science Fiction" (University of Georgia Press) discusses terrible food depicted even in "wonderful futures". He also notes the bland buildings and "overall atmosphere is one of cleanliness and sterility" resembling a hospital, attributing this to depictions of civilizations that "tend to maintain large populations" that "take on the characteristics of institutions."

He wrote the book The Mechanics of Wonder published in 1998 about the history of science fiction genres. A review in Utopian Studies called it "an important book for anyone who deals with the history of science fiction or the description, history, and/or historiography of genres and described it as dealing with a "Battle of the Books, a culture-skirmish between Old World and New World claims to (Science Fiction), between different approaches to scholarship, and on broader politics".

A review of his 2000 book, Science Fiction, Children's Literature and Popular Culture, says it offers strong and intelligent insights about a number of popular cultural forms, but that "the book does not offer any overarching argument" and is too personal in its approach to the subject.

His 2002 book Science Fiction, Canonization, Marginalization, and the Academy, written with George Slusser, "contends that scholars and critics exercise "control over literature" by deciding that some texts and genres should be "enshrined or 'canonized'" while others are marginalized ("exiled") from scholarship and literature classes."

Westfahl edited The Greenwood Encyclopedia of Science Fiction and Fantasy published in 2005. He also edited Science Fiction Quotations. Both books are described as useful and fun.

Westfahl was awarded the Pilgrim Award in 2003 for lifetime contributions to the field of science fiction and fantasy scholarship.

== Personal life ==
Westfahl was born in Washington, DC, in 1951. In 1986, he graduated from Claremont University with a PhD in English. He resides in Claremont, California, with his wife Lynne.

== Selected publications ==
- William Gibson. Modern Masters of Science Fiction (Paperback ed.). Urbana-Champaign: University of Illinois Press. 2013. pp. 1–224. ISBN 978-0-252-07937-5.
- The Spacesuit Film: A History, 1918-1969. Jefferson, NC, and London: McFarland & Company, 2012. 361 + x pp. paper. ISBN 978-0-7864-4267-6
- Editor. Science Fiction Quotations. New Haven: Yale University Press, 2005. 461 + xxi pp. paper.
- Editor. The Greenwood Encyclopedia of Science Fiction and Fantasy: Themes, Works, and Wonders. 3 volumes. Westport, CT: Greenwood Press, 2005. 1395 + xxix pp.
- Science Fiction, Children's Literature and Popular Culture: Coming of Age in Fantasyland. Westport, CT: Greenwood Press, 2000. 157 pp.
- The Mechanics of Wonder: The Creation of the Idea of Science Fiction. Liverpool: Liverpool UP, 1998. 344 pp. (cloth)
- Gary Westfahl and George Slusser, eds. Science Fiction, Canonization, Marginalization, and the Academy.
- Cosmic Engineers: A Study of Hard Science Fiction (Westport, CT: Greenwood Press, 1996) [nonfiction:Hard SF:hb/nonpictorial]
- Islands in the Sky: The Space Station Theme in Science Fiction Literature (San Bernardino, California: Borgo Press, 1996) [nonfiction: preface by Gregory Benford: Space Stations: hb/] ISBN 0-89370-407-5
- Science Fiction Literature through History: An Encyclopedia (Santa Barbara, California: ABC-CLIO/Greenwood, 2021) [nonfiction: published in two volumes: hb/photo/Greg Rakozy, Unsplash.com]
- The Rise and Fall of American Science Fiction, from the 1920s to the 1960s (Jefferson, North Carolina: McFarland Publishers, 2019) [nonfiction :pb/Wood River Gallery]
- The Stuff of Science Fiction: Hardware, Settings, Characters (Jefferson, North Carolina: McFarland Publishers, 2022) [nonfiction: pb/Tithi Luadthong/Liu Zishan/GrandeDuc/Dotted Yeti/Shutterstock]
- A Sense-of-Wonderful Century: Explorations of Science Fiction and Fantasy Films (Rockville, MD: Wildside Press/Borgo Press, 2012 [nonfiction: pb/photocollage]
- A Day in a Working Life: 300 Trades and Professions through History (Santa Barbara, California: ABC-CLIO, 2015) [nonfiction: published in three volumes: hb/photocollage]
- An Alien Abroad: Science Fiction Columns from Interzone (Cabin John, Maryland: Wildside Press, 2016) [nonfiction: pb/uncredited]
- The Other Side of the Sky: An Annotated Bibliography of Space Stations in Science Fiction, 1869-1993 (Rockville, Maryland: Wildside Press/Borgo Press, 2009) [nonfiction: with foreword by Michael Cassutt: Cinema: Spacesuit Films:pb/]
- Hugo Gernsback and the Century of Science Fiction (Jefferson, North Carolina: McFarland Publishers, 2007) [nonfiction: Hugo Gernsback:pb/Frank R. Paul]

=== Articles ===
- "No Bark and No Bite: What Science Fiction Leaves Out of the Future #4". The Internet Review of Science Fiction. VII (2). February 2010.

ISFDB catalogs perhaps 100 publications.
