= Comets in fiction =

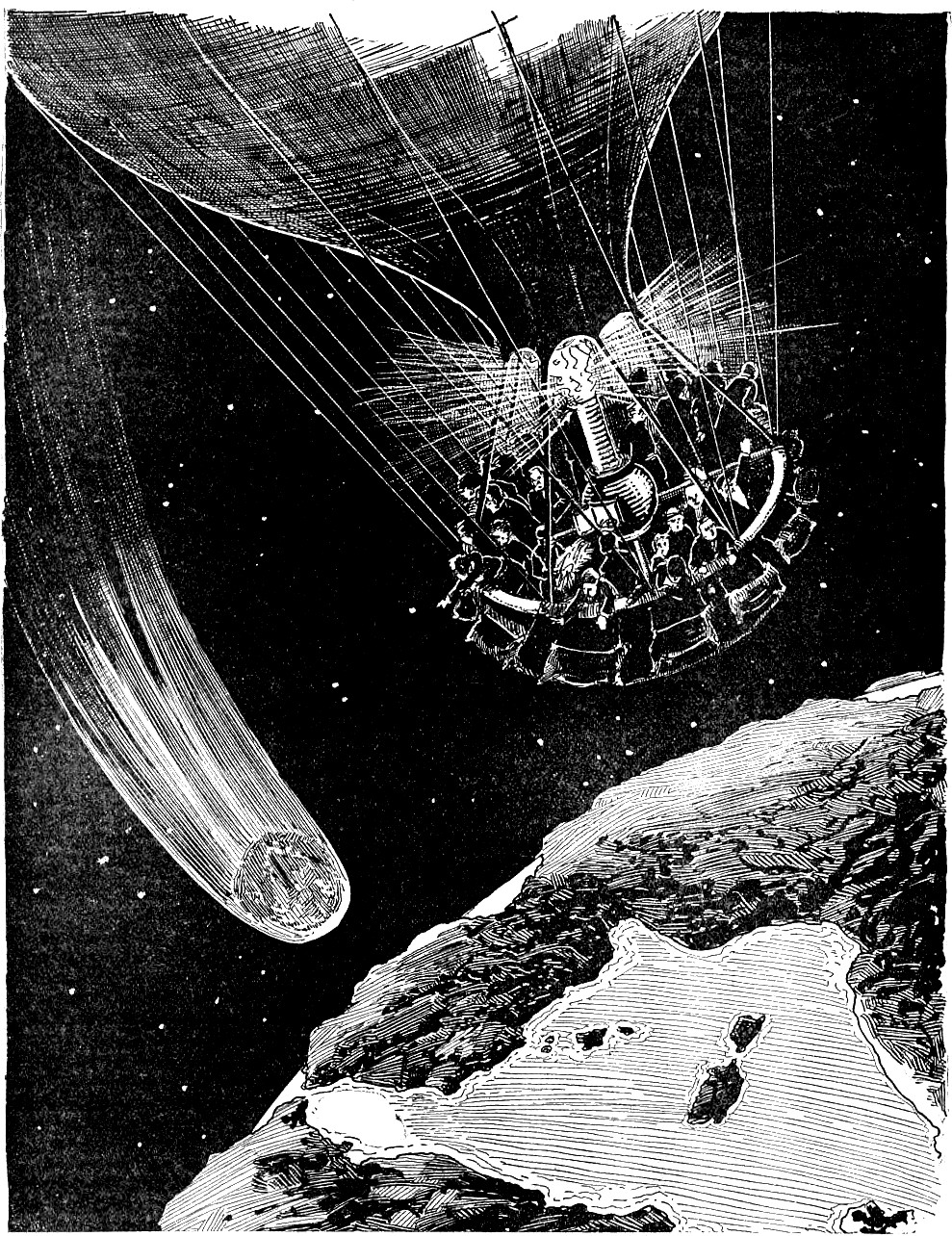
Illustration from Jules Verne's 1877 novel Hector Servadac (English title: Off on a Comet)

Comets have appeared in works of fiction since at least the 1830s. They primarily appear in science fiction as literal objects, but also make occasional symbolical appearances in other genres. In keeping with their traditional cultural associations as omens, they often threaten destruction to Earth. This commonly comes in the form of looming impact events, and occasionally through more novel means such as affecting Earth's atmosphere in different ways. In other stories, humans seek out and visit comets for purposes of research or resource extraction. Comets are inhabited by various forms of life ranging from microbes to vampires in different depictions, and are themselves living beings in some stories.

== Omens ==
Comets have been regarded as harbingers of doom since antiquity, which has influenced their depiction in fiction. The rare early appearances were typically symbolical in nature, and this remains the case outside of science fiction. Comets have thus continued to play their traditional role as omens in modern works of fiction, particularly fantasy such as E. R. Eddison's 1922 novel The Worm Ouroboros and the 1998 novel A Clash of Kings in George R. R. Martin's A Song of Ice and Fire series. In the latter, different cultures and factions interpret the comet in wildly divergent and occasionally contradictory ways, making the comet "a Rorschach test for the inhabitants of the world". Outside of fantasy, the 1996–1999 television series Millennium features a comet that foreshadows a disease outbreak. Ominous comets also appear in the tabletop game franchise Warhammer and the video game series Myth.

== Destruction ==
Comets play three major roles in science fiction: as places to land on and explore, potential menaces to life on Earth, and resources to exploit.

— Gary Westfahl, Science Fiction Literature through History: An Encyclopedia, "Comets and Meteoroids" entry

The majority of works depicting comets belong to the science fiction genre, where in contrast to other genres comets are not usually used for symbolism but instead play a role as literal objects. In these stories, they often cause death and destruction. An early science fiction example is Edgar Allan Poe's 1839 short story "The Conversation of Eiros and Charmion", wherein part of the Earth's atmosphere is lost to a comet, with catastrophic results.

Throughout the 1800s, the threat of impact events appeared in works ranging from Oliver Wendell Holmes Sr.'s c. 1833 poem "The Comet" to Chauncey Thomas's 1891 utopian novel The Crystal Button; Or Adventures of Paul Prognosis in the Forty-Ninth Century. In Robert Duncan Milne's 1882 short story duology "Into the Sun" and "Plucked from the Burning", society collapses when Earth undergoes a global heat wave as a result of a comet striking the Sun. In Camille Flammarion's 1894 novel Omega: The Last Days of the World, scientists speculate on the various ways a comet impact could lead to humanity's extinction, though the event itself turns out to be survivable; a loose film adaptation by Abel Gance called End of the World was released in 1931. In George Griffith's 1897 short story "The Great Crellin Comet" (later expanded into the 1907 novel The World Peril of 1910), humanity constructs cannons to fire at a comet heading for Earth in order to avert disaster.

In the 1900s, a successive shift occurred wherein comets were largely replaced by other objects such as asteroids in threatening harm to Earth. Nevertheless, the 1908 Tunguska event—then speculated to have been caused by a comet—had a long-lasting influence on disaster stories, and cometary impact events continued to appear in works like Jack Bechdolt's 1920 novel The Torch, where one such event forms part of the backstory for the post-apocalyptic setting. Conversely, Dennis Wheatley's 1939 novel Sixty Days to Live depicts the lead-up to an expected catastrophic collision by a comet with Earth. In Tove Jansson's 1946 Moomin novel Comet in Moominland, a predicted impact instead turns out a near miss, but heat from the comet nevertheless results in a drought. The 1977 novel Lucifer's Hammer by Larry Niven and Jerry Pournelle revolves around a highly destructive impact event and its aftermath; astronomer Andrew Fraknoi describes it as being "among the first of the scientifically reasonable impact stories". In the 1988 novel Land's End by Jack Williamson and Frederik Pohl, a comet strike destroys the Earth's ozone layer, rendering the surface of the planet uninhabitable for humanity and forcing a migration beneath the oceans. Stephen Baxter's 2002 novel Evolution portrays the extinction of the dinosaurs as the result of a comet impact creating the Chicxulub crater.

Besides striking the Earth directly, comets pose threats to humanity by colliding with the Moon in Jack McDevitt's 1998 novel Moonfall, where the impact shatters the Moon; and Susan Beth Pfeffer's 2010 novel This World We Live In, where it alters the Moon's orbit, resulting in weather patterns on Earth being disrupted. Other mechanisms by which comets cause calamities appear in works like W. E. B. Du Bois's 1920 short story "The Comet", where toxic gases from the comet leave a black man and a white woman in New York City as the only survivors; George Weston's 1934 novel His First Million Women, where all men except one are rendered infertile; Robert S. Richardson's 1946 short story "The Blindness", where the passage of Halley's Comet disrupts the ozone layer; (Note: Stephen L. Gillett, writing in The Greenwood Encyclopedia of Science Fiction and Fantasy, comments that this may be the first time the disruption of the ozone layer was used as a major plot point.) and Max Gunther's 1986 novel Doom Wind, where a close encounter with a comet creates immensely powerful winds. A rare example of the opposite—positive effects arising from Earth encountering a comet—appears in H. G. Wells's 1906 novel In the Days of the Comet: the gases in the comet's tail alter the atmosphere in a way that transforms human character for the better.

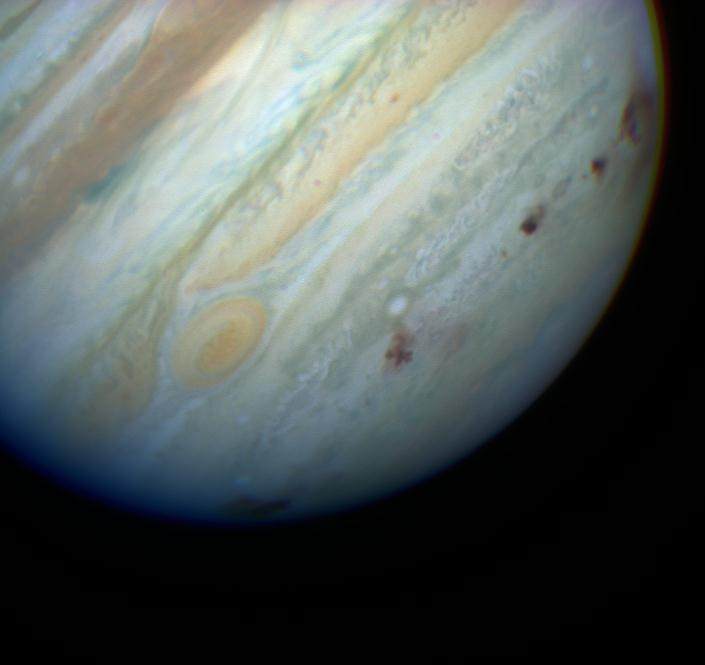
Dark spots visible on Jupiter following the impact of Comet Shoemaker–Levy 9 in 1994

Outside of literature, impact events—both by comets and other objects such as asteroids—appeared only infrequently for most of the 1900s; the impact of Comet Shoemaker–Levy 9 on Jupiter in 1994 was followed by a sharp increase in depictions of such events across film, television, and video games. Weaponized comets appear in the 1985 Doctor Who serial "Attack of the Cybermen" and the 1998 episode "Little Girl Lost" of Superman: The Animated Series, in both of which the villains redirect comets towards Earth. The theme of averting disaster by intercepting an approaching comet appears in the 1990 video game Damocles, the 1998 film Deep Impact, and the 2021 film Don't Look Up—the last of which uses it as a vehicle for satire, where humanity's inept handling of the situation serves as an allegory for real-world efforts to combat climate change. A different type of disaster appears in the 1984 film Night of the Comet, where the passage of a comet triggers a zombie apocalypse.

== Expeditions ==
Besides comets coming to Earth, they are also visited by humans in some stories. These concepts are combined in Jules Verne's 1877 novel Hector Servadac (English title: Off on a Comet), where a cometary encounter with Earth results in a number of humans traversing the Solar System with the comet. More intentional visits to comets appear in Arthur C. Clarke's 1960 short story "Into the Comet", where humans exploring a comet end up stranded there as a result of a technological malfunction; Hal Clement's 1960 short story "Sunspot", where a comet is repurposed as a space station for studying the Sun at close range; and the 1971 short story "West Wind, Falling" by Gregory Benford and Gordon Eklund, where a comet is used as a means of transportation. Ray Bradbury's 1968 radio play Leviathan 99 adapts the story of Herman Melville's 1851 novel Moby-Dick to space, with a comet standing in for the chased whale. In Duncan Lunan's 1972 short story "The Comet, the Cairn, and the Capsule", an expedition to a comet discovers that there are space probes on it that have been left by aliens. On the fantastical side, the 1907 short story "Extract from Captain Stormfield's Visit to Heaven" by Mark Twain—who was born around the appearance of Halley's Comet in 1835 and correctly predicted that he would die around the time of its next appearance in 1910—sees a comet used as a vehicle to heaven.

== Resources ==
Several stories depict the extraction of resources, mainly water, from comets. Such cometary water is used for terraforming Mars in Frederik Pohl's 1992 novel Mining the Oort; Pohl had earlier touched upon the comet mining theme in the 1980 novel Beyond the Blue Event Horizon (part of his Heechee series), where intelligent aliens systematically harvest the CHON elements (carbon, hydrogen, oxygen, and nitrogen) necessary for life from comets. A spaceship that intercepts comets in the Oort cloud and steers them towards the inner Solar System for further processing appears in Alastair Reynolds's 2005 novel Pushing Ice. The terraforming concept is combined with the impact motif in the 1984 novel Double Planet by Marcus Chown and John Gribbin, where a comet heading for Earth is diverted to instead strike the Moon and thus create a rudimentary lunar atmosphere, and the 1989 anime film Venus Wars, where a comet strike on Venus makes for a thinner atmosphere and a higher level of humidity, providing the necessary conditions for further terraforming of the planet.

== Cometary life ==
An early example of life on a comet appears in Humphry Davy's 1830 novel Consolations in Travel. Comets inhabited by various kinds of lifeforms appear in several stories published in science fiction magazines during the pulp era of science fiction: the titular creatures in Festus Pragnell's 1933 short story "Men of the Dark Comet" are sentient plants, Archibald Low's 1934 novel Adrift in the Stratosphere features telepathic humans on a comet with Earth-like conditions, and Jack Williamson's 1936 novel The Cometeers depicts an invasion of the Solar System by invisible vampiric energy-based organisms who arrive by comet. The vampire motif reappeared decades later in the 1985 film Lifeforce, this time with psychic powers. The 1986 novel Heart of the Comet by Gregory Benford and David Brin depicts an expedition to Halley's Comet that discovers a complex ecosphere including microbial life there. The 1987 video game Jesus: Dreadful Bio-Monster also reveals Halley's comet to be an abode of life. Stephen Baxter's 1993 short story "The Sun-People" features an exotic cometary lifeform that incorporates liquid helium into its biology in the remote reaches of the Kuiper belt. When not home to native lifeforms, comets may also be settled, as in Poul Anderson's 1994 novel The Stars Are Also Fire.

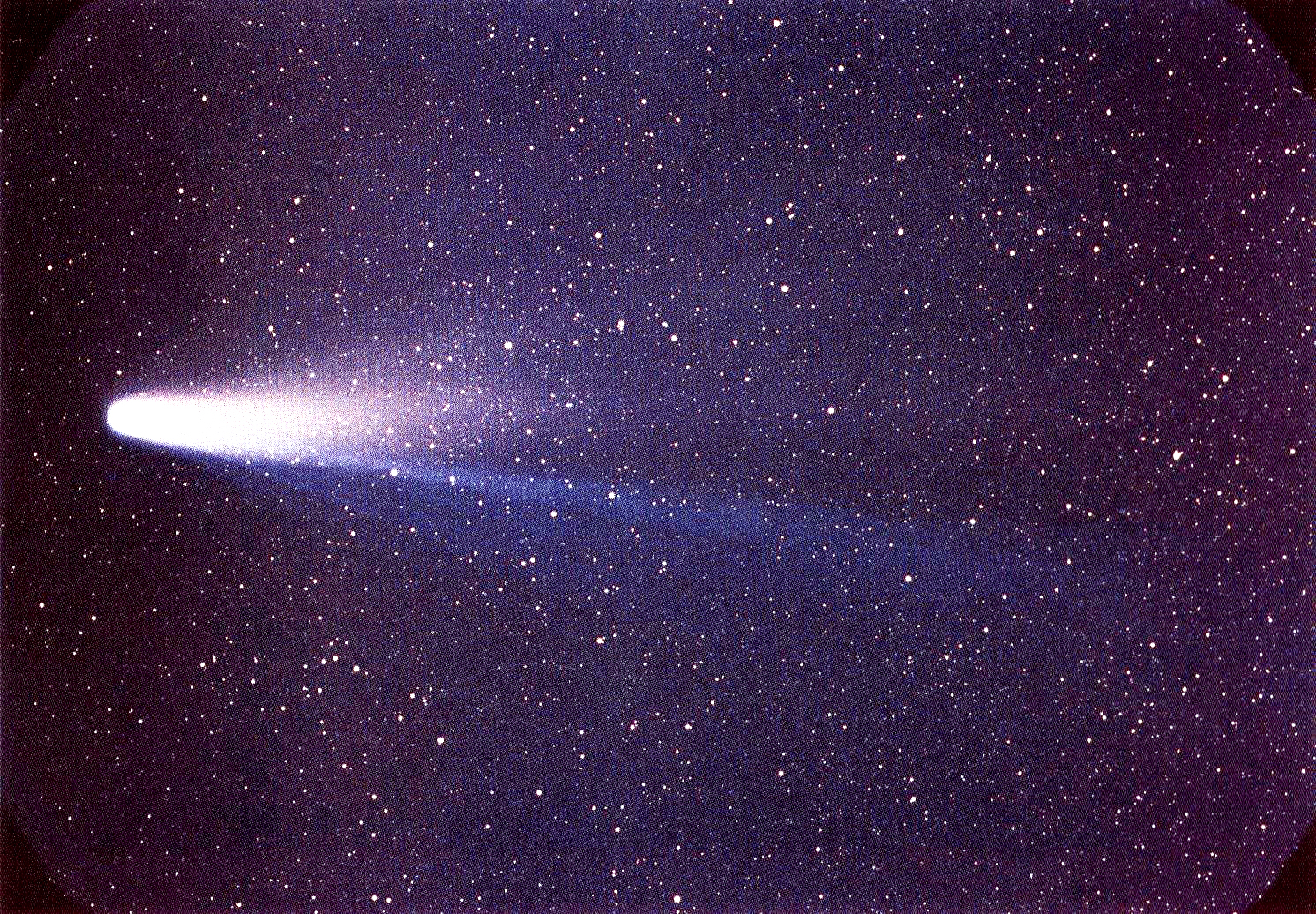
Halley's Comet, here pictured during its 1986 appearance, is a living entity in several works of fiction.

Comets themselves are alive in some works. Halley's Comet appears in anthropomorphized thinking form in Robert S. Richardson's 1946 short story "The Blindness" and Fred Hoyle's 1985 novel Comet Halley; it is outright personified in Diana Wynne Jones' 2007 novel The Game. Besides being applied to Halley, the concept also appears in Richardson's 1967 short story "The Red Euphoric Bands". In Arthur C. Clarke's 1975 novel Imperial Earth, a character speculates that comets may be the remains of deceased exotic lifeforms, while Ken MacLeod's 2000 short story "The Oort Crowd" suggests that they are in fact deities.

== See also ==
- Asteroids in fiction
- Comets (anthology)

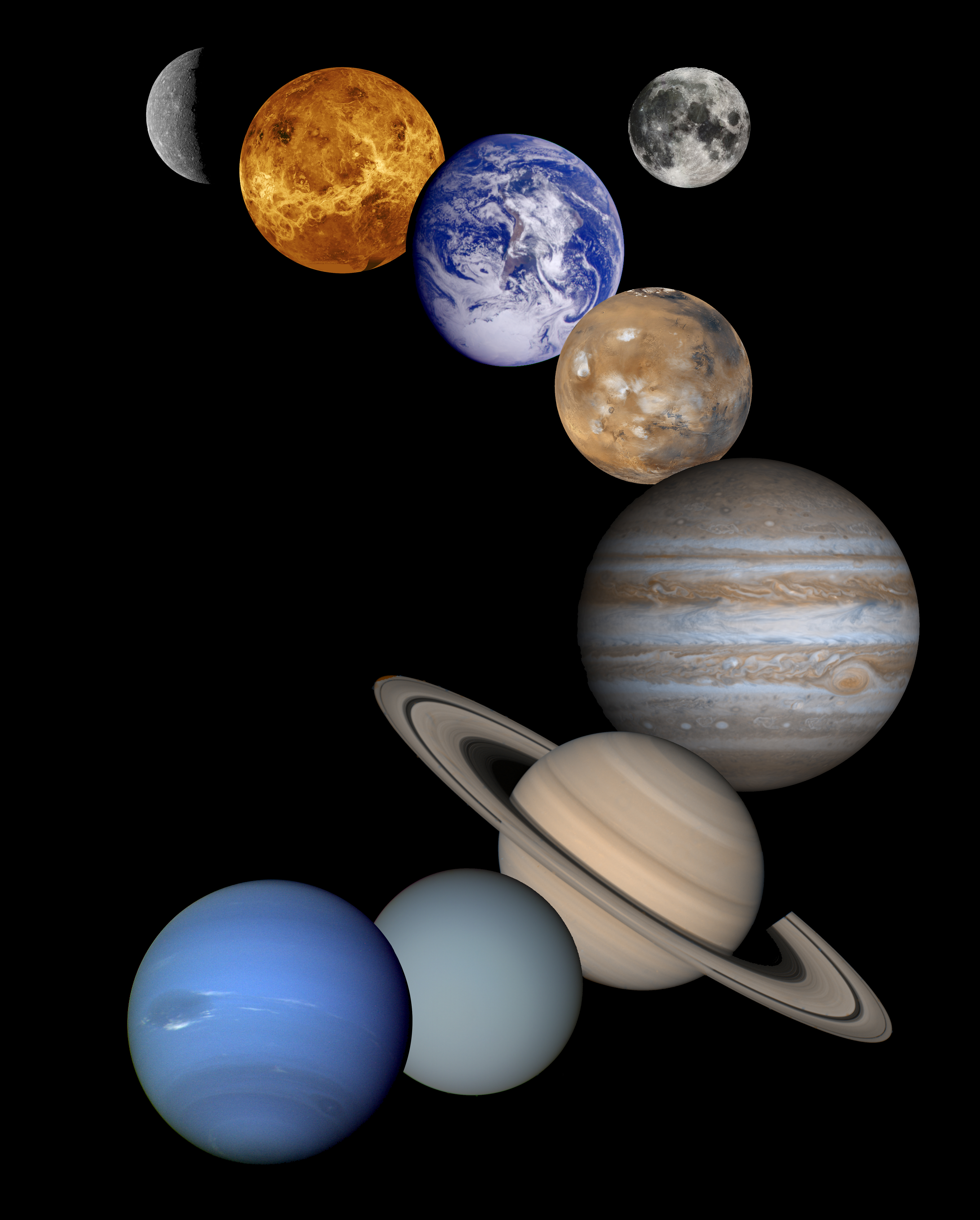
