= Sun in fiction =

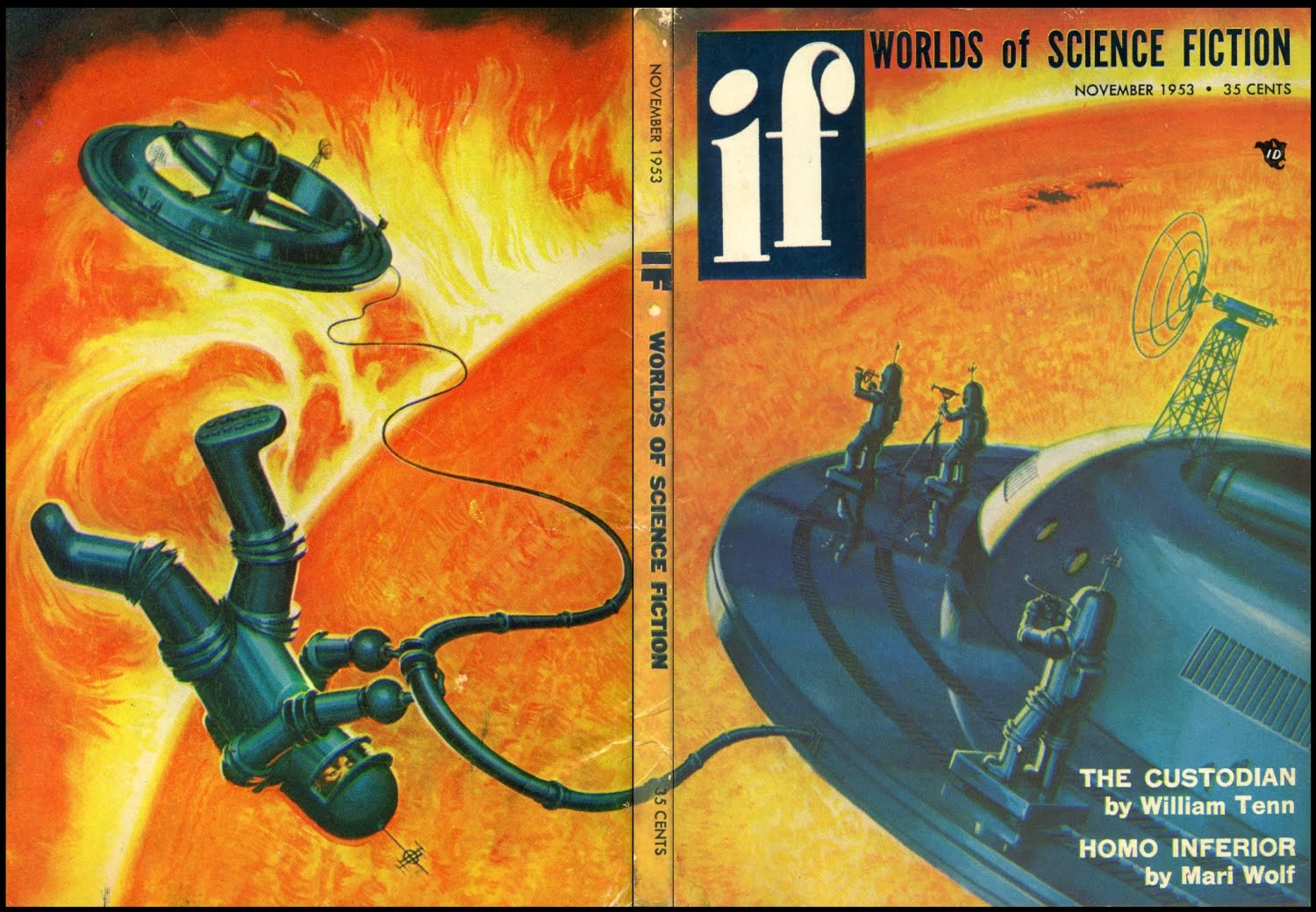
"Surveying a Dying Sun", cover of If, November 1953

The Sun has appeared as a setting in fiction at least since classical antiquity, but for a long time it received relatively sporadic attention. Many of the early depictions viewed it as an essentially Earth-like and thus potentially habitable body—a once-common belief about celestial objects in general known as the plurality of worlds—and depicted various kinds of solar inhabitants. As more became known about the Sun through advances in astronomy, in particular its temperature, solar inhabitants fell out of favour save for the occasional more exotic alien lifeforms. Instead, many stories focused on the eventual death of the Sun and the havoc it would wreak upon life on Earth. Before it was understood that the Sun is powered by nuclear fusion, the prevailing assumption among writers was that combustion was the source of its heat and light, and it was expected to run out of fuel relatively soon. Even after the true source of the Sun's energy was determined in the 1920s, the dimming or extinction of the Sun remained a recurring theme in disaster stories, with occasional attempts at averting disaster by reigniting the Sun. Another common way for the Sun to cause destruction is by exploding ("going nova"), and other mechanisms such as solar flares also appear on occasion.

Besides being a source of destruction, the Sun has been used in fiction as a source of power—both in the form of solar power and superpowers. The solar wind is also used for propulsion by spacecraft equipped with solar sails. Solar eclipses have appeared in a large number of stories, in the earliest ones often used as a ruse by characters who know that they can be predicted mathematically against those who do not by pretending to cause them, perhaps inspired by the story of Christopher Columbus doing the same with a lunar eclipse in 1504. When audiences grew weary of this trope by the 1930s or 1940s, eclipses became much more rare in fiction writing, though they saw a comeback towards the end of the century as harbingers of social upheaval. Sunspots, and their 11-year cycle of frequency in occurrence, appear in a small number of works. The Sun poses a danger to spacecraft that approach it closely, a situation that occurs by necessity or design in several stories. It is sometimes depicted as being sentient, though this is rare compared to other stars getting the same treatment. Overall, the Sun remains relatively uncommon as a point of focus in science fiction, particularly in comparison to depictions of Mars and Venus; says science fiction bibliographer Richard Bleiler, "Perhaps because it is generally taken for granted, the fictive potential of the Sun has barely been tapped".

== Early depictions: inhabited ==
Although the Moon was visited early and often in science fiction, the fictive potential of the Sun was not explored until relatively late.

— Richard Bleiler, The Greenwood Encyclopedia of Science Fiction and Fantasy, "The Sun" entry

The Sun received comparatively little specific attention in early science fiction; prior to the late 1800s, when Mars became the most popular celestial object in fiction, the Sun was a distant second to the Moon. A large proportion of the works that nevertheless did focus on the Sun portrayed it as having inhabitants. In Lucian of Samosata's work A True Story from the second century CE, described by science fiction scholar Gary Westfahl as the first depiction of space travel in fiction, the inhabitants of the Sun are at war with those of the Moon. Later stories with an inhabited Sun include Athanasius Kircher's 1656 work Itinerarium exstaticum, where life in the usual sense does not exist on the Sun but angelic beings do, and Cyrano de Bergerac's posthumously published 1662 novel Comical History of the States and Empires of the Sun. In the 1700s, solar inhabitants were depicted by French authors Chevalier de Béthune, whose 1750 novel Relation du Monde de Mercure describes them ruling over the inhabitants of Mercury, and Marie-Anne de Roumier-Robert, whose 1765 novel Voyage de Milord Céton dans les sept planètes portrays a society on the Sun characterized by equality of the sexes.

The concept of the plurality of worlds—the notion that other heavenly bodies should be essentially Earth-like and therefore habitable—endured in fiction with regard to the Sun well into the 1800s. These works include George Fowler's 1813 novel A Flight to the Moon; or, The Vision of Randalthus, the anonymously published 1837 novel Journeys into the Moon, Several Planets and the Sun, and Joel R. Peabody's 1838 novel A World of Wonders. Even in the early 1900s, when the temperature of the surface of the Sun had been determined by spectroscopic measurement, the portrayal of the Sun as inhabited persisted in some works of juvenile fiction such as John Mastin's 1909 novel Through the Sun in an Airship and Donald Horner's 1910 novel By Aeroplane to the Sun.

In the 1900s, as it became evident that no conventional organisms could possibly survive the conditions on the Sun, more exotic solar lifeforms started appearing in fiction. Some of these live inside the Sun itself rather than on its surface, as in short stories like Jack Williamson's 1935 "Islands of the Sun", Raymond Z. Gallun's 1935 "Nova Solis", and Henry J. Kostkos's 1936 "We of the Sun". Others take up residence elsewhere in the Solar System: in Leigh Brackett's 1942 short story "Child of the Sun", an intelligent alien from the Sun lives in the hollow interior of the fictional planet Vulcan inside the orbit of Mercury, and the titular creatures of Olaf Stapledon's 1947 novel The Flames are lizard-like solar beings residing inside igneous rocks on Earth. Arthur C. Clarke's 1958 short story "Out of the Sun" features life "formed of tangles of magnetic flux on the surface of our Sun", and Edmond Hamilton's 1962 short story "Sunfire!" depicts an energy-based lifeform living in the Sun's corona.

== Disaster ==
The Sun has been a source of destruction or the threat thereof in many stories, most commonly either by fading or exploding. In the rare science fiction films where the Sun is a central point of focus, it seldom plays any other role.

=== Dimming and extinction ===
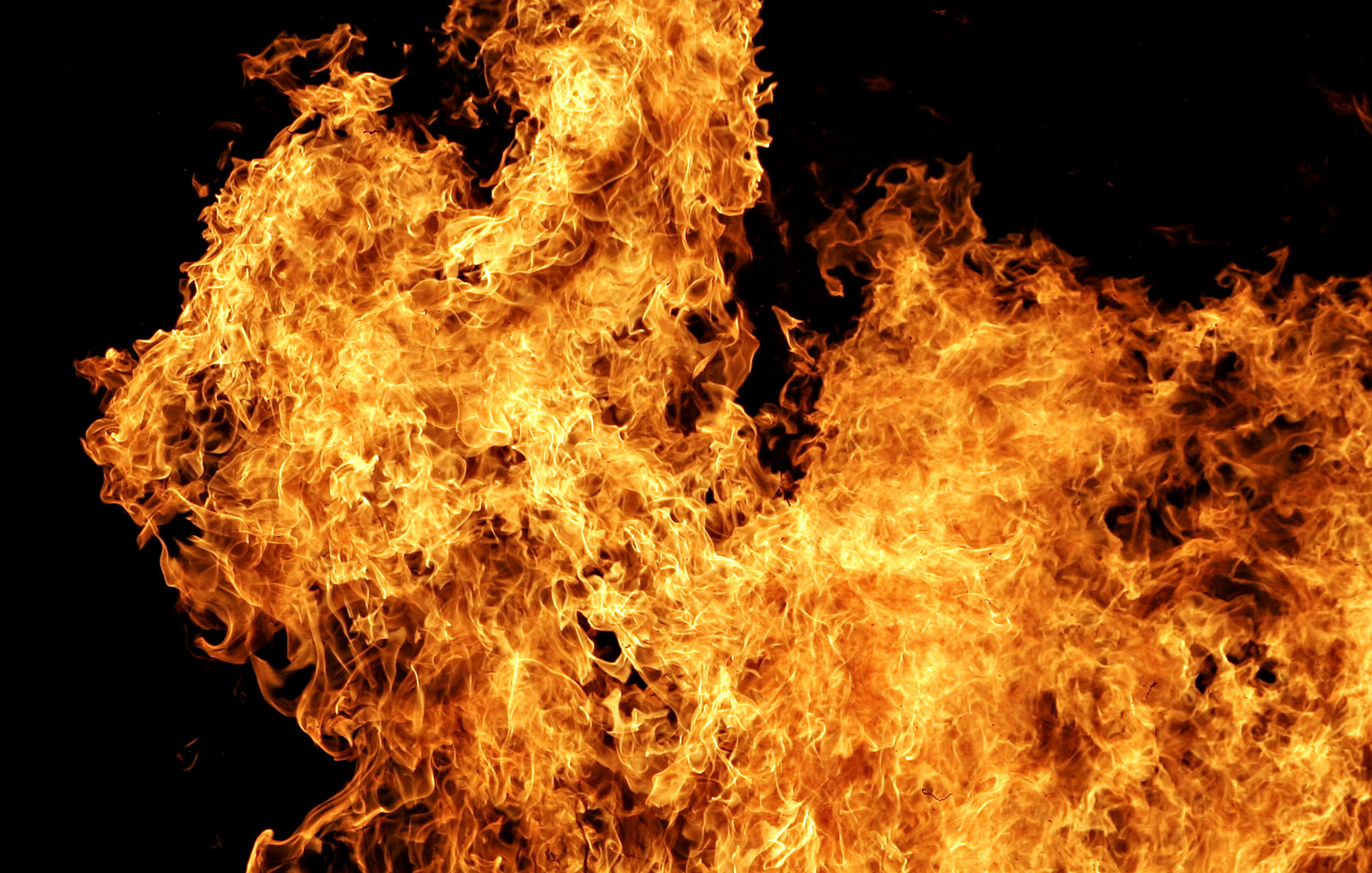
When the Sun was assumed by writers to be powered by combustion, it was expected to burn out in the relatively near future.

The dimming or extinction of the Sun has been a recurring theme. The earliest such stories were inspired by the assumption that the heat and light of the Sun were products of combustion, and that the fuel sustaining it would eventually run out. Physicist Lord Kelvin estimated in 1862—based on a model where the heat was the result of gravitational contraction—that the Sun would fade within a few million years, a timeframe that was later incorporated in stories by Camille Flammarion and H. G. Wells, among others. In Flammarion's 1894 novel Omega: The Last Days of the World, humanity survives an encounter with a comet but succumbs to the dimming of the Sun thousands of years later, while the time traveller in Wells's 1895 novel The Time Machine discovers a cooled and reddened Sun over a barren Earth in the far future. Similarly, stories about the end of the world involving the death of the Sun were written in the early 1900s by among others George C. Wallis, whose 1901 short story "The Last Days of Earth" depicts the last survivors leaving a frozen Earth for a potentially habitable planet in another planetary system, and William Hope Hodgson, whose 1908 novel The House on the Borderland describes one character's vision of the destruction of both the Earth and Sun.

By the 1920s, the gravitational contraction hypothesis had fallen out of favour. The new explanation was that the Sun was fuelled by nuclear fusion, an understanding that was pioneered by the work of astrophysicist Arthur Eddington. As a result, science fiction authors started incorporating much longer solar lifespans in their stories, with J. B. S. Haldane's 1927 work "The Last Judgment" and Olaf Stapledon's 1930 novel Last and First Men both outlining the future evolution of humanity throughout millions of years of variation in solar luminosity. Stories depicting the Sun waning nevertheless kept appearing, such as Clark Ashton Smith's stories about the fictional future continent Zothique starting with the 1932 short story "The Empire of the Necromancers", and Jack Vance's Dying Earth series starting with the 1950 anthology The Dying Earth which also gave its name to the dying Earth subgenre of science fiction. Nat Schachner's 1934 short story "When the Sun Dies" describes the entire Earth freezing over in the 1980s as a result of a reduction in solar activity, and in Arthur C. Clarke's 1949 short story "History Lesson", future Venusians find humanity extinct due to the environmental changes brought about by the Sun fading. Clarke also touched upon the subject in the 1938 poem "The Twilight of the Sun" and the 1979 novel The Fountains of Paradise. In a variation on the theme, Fritz Leiber's 1951 short story "A Pail of Air" depicts Earth having been pulled away from the gravitational influence of the Sun and thus turned into a rogue planet, with a climate so cold that air has frozen and needs to be collected and thawed to turn it gaseous and breathable. Edmond Hamilton's 1934 short story "Thundering Worlds" sees all the planets leaving the Solar System to find a new star as the Sun dies, while his 1963 comic book story "Superman Under the Red Sun" depicts Superman travelling into the far future and losing his superpowers as a result of the aging red Sun. Eric C. Williams's 1965 short story "Sunout" depicts scientists reacting to the realization that the Sun is about to go out and they are powerless to do anything about it. In the 2019 film The Wandering Earth, the death of the Sun prompts humanity to relocate the entire Earth to a new planetary system.

A handful of stories describe efforts to reignite the fading Sun. In Clark Ashton Smith's 1954 short story "Phoenix" (written c. 1935), this is accomplished by detonating several nuclear weapons on the Sun's surface. In Gene Wolfe's 1980–1983 four-volume novel The Book of the New Sun and its sequels, a white hole is used to reinvigorate the dying Sun. The concept of using an explosive device for this purpose is also explored in the 2007 film Sunshine.

=== Exploding ===
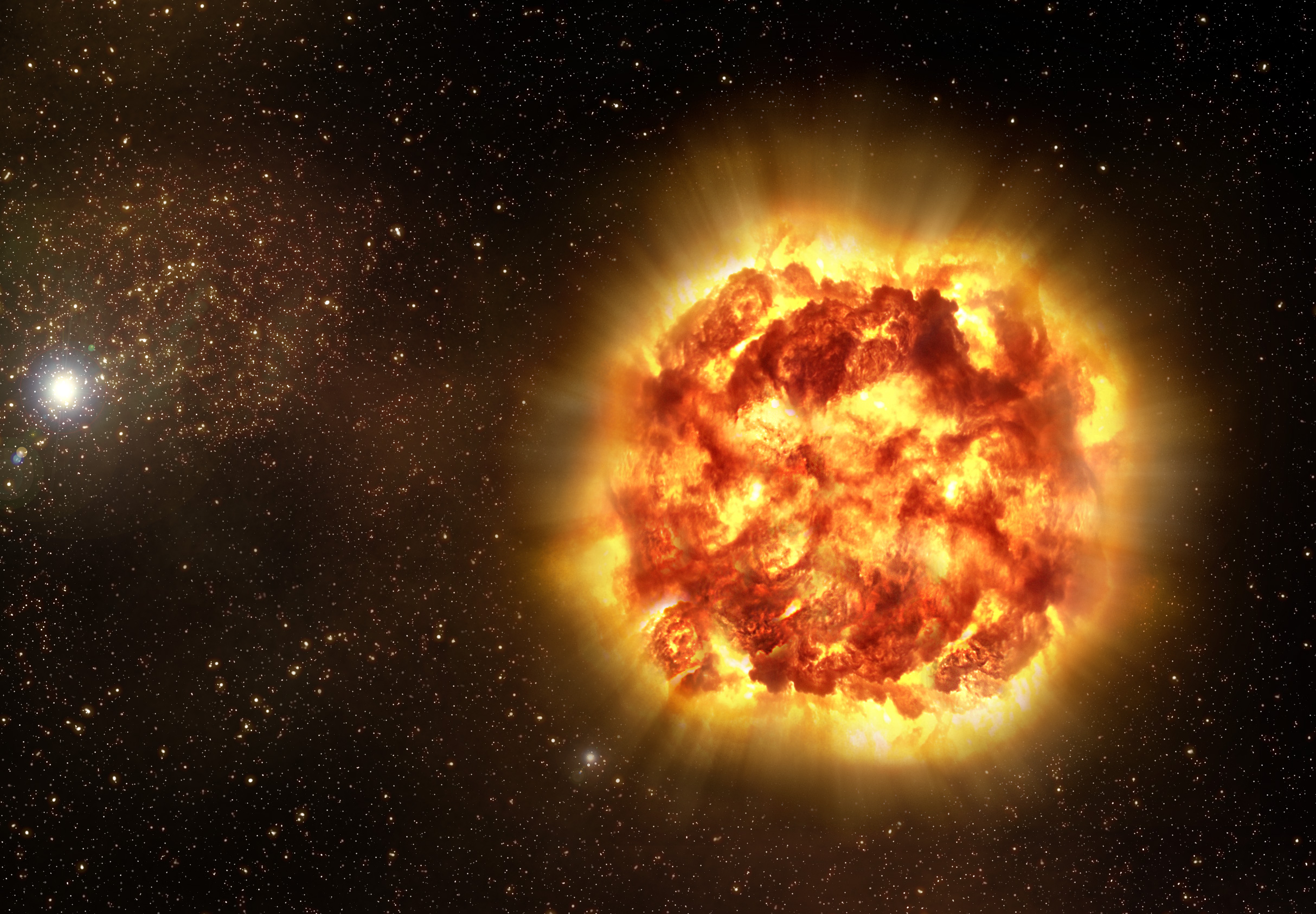
Artist's impression of an exploding star. Several stories depict the Sun undergoing such an event.

Several stories depict the Sun exploding, or "going nova". It was recognized early on that the immense destructive power of such an event would leave little to no hope of survival for humanity, and so while Simon Newcomb's 1903 short story "The End of the World" depicts a few survivors in the immediate aftermath, Hugh Kingsmill's 1924 short story also entitled "The End of the World" instead focuses on the anticipation of the destruction of the Earth. According to science fiction scholar Brian Stableford, writing in the 2006 work Science Fact and Science Fiction: An Encyclopedia, it was thus not until the concept of space travel became widespread in science fiction—hence making evacuation of the Earth a conceivable prospect—that such stories became popular. In John W. Campbell's 1930 short story "The Voice of the Void" humanity leaves Earth ahead of this disaster, while in Joseph W. Skidmore's 1931 short story "Dramatis Personae" the Sun explodes without warning, leaving a few people already in spaceships as the only survivors. In Arthur C. Clarke's 1946 short story "Rescue Party", aliens come to Earth to save humanity from the violent demise of the Sun only to find that evacuation has already been undertaken, whereas in his 1954 short story "No Morning After", the aliens' warning goes unheeded. J. T. McIntosh's 1954 novel One in Three Hundred deals with the allocation of the limited capacity aboard the evacuating spaceships. The Sun exploding occasionally appears as a background event to explain why humanity has abandoned Earth in favour of colonizing the cosmos, one example being Theodore Sturgeon's 1956 short story "The Skills of Xanadu". In Norman Spinrad's 1966 novel The Solarians, the Sun is intentionally made to explode in an act of interstellar warfare, while in Larry Niven's 1971 short story "The Fourth Profession" aliens plan to induce such an event to use as a power source for space travel. In Edward Wellen's 1971 novel Hijack, the Mafia is duped into abandoning Earth by being misled that the Sun will turn into a nova. Connie Willis's 1979 short story "Daisy, in the Sun" is a coming-of-age parable that relates a young girl getting her first period to the imminent end of the world. It is now recognized that the Sun cannot explode in this manner as the necessary stellar conditions are not met. (Note: Most types of supernovae result from the core of a star far more massive than the Sun undergoing gravitational collapse, and the remaining type Ia supernovae—as well as the less energetic novae—result from matter accreting onto a white dwarf from a binary companion.)

=== Other ===
The heat of the Sun dooms life on Earth when the Earth's orbit is disrupted in John Hawkins's 1938 short story "Ark of Fire", the 1961 film The Day the Earth Caught Fire, and the 1961 episode "The Midnight Sun" of the television show The Twilight Zone. More fancifully, Clare Winger Harris's 1928 short story "The Menace of Mars" depicts an increase in heat from the Sun threatening the Earth as a result of a general cosmological change in the properties of the universe, which leads Mars to adjust Earth's orbit to serve as a shield against the Sun's radiation.

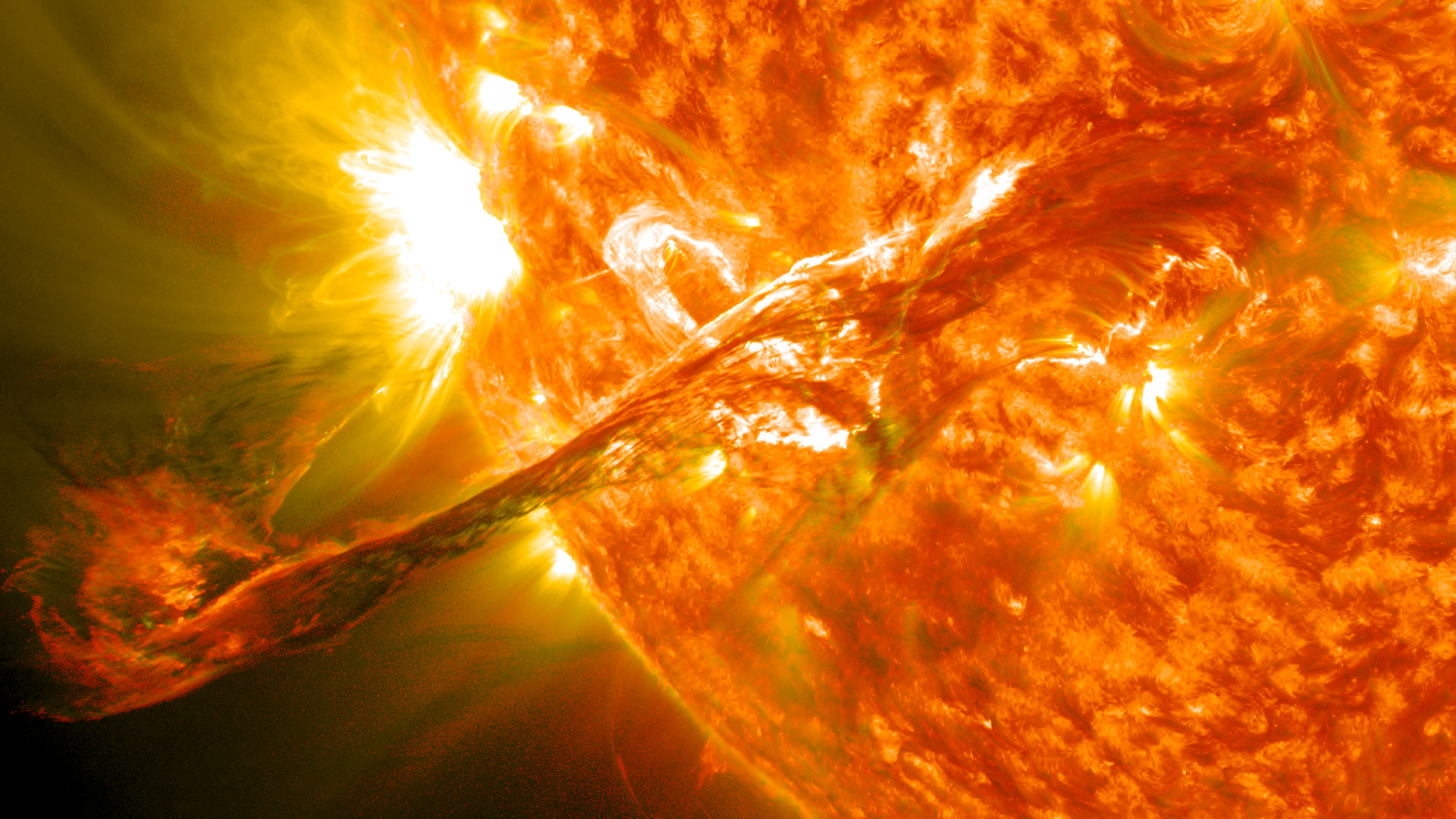
A filament eruption, a type of solar storm

Solar storms such as solar flares appear in some stories. In Larry Niven's 1971 short story "Inconstant Moon", the sudden brightening of the Moon in the night sky leads the characters to conclude that the Sun has undergone a nova event that will destroy all life on Earth, though they later realize that a large solar flare would also produce that effect and that all hope might not be lost. The 1990 film Solar Crisis depicts a mission to bomb the Sun to avert the destruction that could be caused by an immense predicted solar flare, while the 2005 novel Sunstorm by Arthur C. Clarke and Stephen Baxter portrays mankind constructing a large shielding object at the Sun–Earth L_{1} Lagrange point as protection against the threat posed by a similar event. In David Koepp's 2022 novel Aurora, a coronal mass ejection threatens to end human civilization; the book appears alongside Niven's "Inconstant Moon" on a list of science fiction works with relatively scientifically plausible depictions of the Sun compiled by astronomer Andrew Fraknoi.

More long-lasting changes in solar output appear in Arthur G. Stangland's 1932 short story "50th Century Revolt", where an increase in solar activity forces humanity to slow the rotation of the Earth to a synchronous rotation—where the same side of the Earth faces the Sun at all times, thus protecting the other half of the planet from the scorching heat—for two millennia until the Sun dims again, and George O. Smith's 1953 novel Troubled Star, where aliens seek to turn the Sun into a variable star.

== Properties and phenomena ==
=== Orbital mechanics ===
Schematic diagram of the shared orbit of Earth and the fictional Counter-Earth (Gor). The two planets are always hidden from each other's view by the Sun. In reality, this orbital arrangement would not be stable.

The Sun hides Counter-Earth—a planet diametrically opposite Earth in its orbit—in some stories including Edgar Wallace's 1929 novel Planetoid 127 and John Norman's Gor series starting with the 1966 novel Tarnsman of Gor. This Counter-Earth is inhabited by counterparts of the people of Earth in the 1969 film Doppelgänger (a.k.a. Journey to the Far Side of the Sun) and by a society of women in the 1950s comic strip Twin Earths. The position of Counter-Earth corresponds to the Sun–Earth L_{3} Lagrange point, and the other Lagrange points of the Sun–Earth system—as well as others such as the Sun–Venus and Sun–Jupiter systems—also appear in fiction on occasion. The 1972 anthology The Day the Sun Stood Still contains three different short stories (by Poul Anderson, Robert Silverberg, and Gordon R. Dickson) where the Sun stops in the sky as in the biblical Book of Joshua.

=== Power source ===
The energy output of the Sun was harnessed for power production in fiction as early as Hugo Gernsback's 1911 novel Ralph 124C 41+ and in several stories since, with Robert A. Heinlein's 1940 short story "Let There Be Light" describing economically viable solar panels and Isaac Asimov's 1941 short story "Reason" (later included in the 1950 fix-up novel I, Robot) depicting solar power produced in space but consumed on Earth. Other works have depicted solar arrays in close orbits around the Sun itself; Murray Leinster's 1931 short story "The Power Planet" features a variant that uses thermoelectric rather than photovoltaic principles. The Sun is also the source of comic book superhero Superman's superpowers, as well as those of supervillains Sun Girl from DC Comics and Solarr from Marvel Comics.

=== Solar wind ===
Following German astronomer Ludwig Biermann's 1951 discovery of the solar wind—a stream of charged particles from the Sun—stories emerged about spacecraft with solar sails. These devices capture the small amount of pressure pointing away from the Sun exerted by the solar wind, as well as the radiation pressure from the sunlight itself, and use it for propulsion. The idea was popular in 1960s science fiction, appearing among others in Jack Vance's 1962 short story "Gateway to Strangeness" and Cordwainer Smith's 1963 short story "Think Blue, Count Two". Arthur C. Clarke's 1964 short story "Sunjammer" (a.k.a. "The Wind from the Sun") depicts a race to the Moon between solar sail-propelled spacecraft. Robert A. Heinlein had earlier written about a proto-variation on the concept using an inertialess drive. The 1990 anthology Project Solar Sail edited by Clarke and David Brin collects various stories and essays about solar sails.

=== Eclipses ===
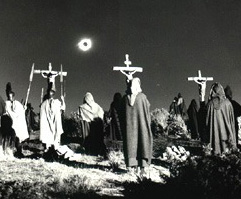
The 1961 film Barabbas portrayed the crucifixion darkness by filming during the totality of the solar eclipse of February 15, 1961.

Solar eclipses are plot points in many stories. Owing to the dramatic experience of witnessing an eclipse, there is a long association with dread. They often serve as omens—especially in fantasy—a role they have in common with comets and planetary conjunctions, or otherwise have some supernatural significance. In the 1988 film The Seventh Sign, an eclipse is a sign of the apocalypse. Eclipses that occur at different times than predicted reveal orbital disruption in R. C. Sherriff's 1939 novel The Hopkins Manuscript and the 1961 film The Day the Earth Caught Fire.

Using knowledge of the underlying astronomy to be able to predict eclipses mathematically is a common trope—according to Stableford, it "became a key method by which European explorers could impress superstitious native populations in adventure stories". Several sources attribute the popularity of this trope to the possibly-apocryphal story of Christopher Columbus using foreknowledge of the March 1504 lunar eclipse to defuse a situation of increasingly strained relations with the Arawak people on Jamaica by pretending to cause the eclipse. H. Rider Haggard's 1885 novel King Solomon's Mines originally featured a solar eclipse in this manner, though later editions substituted a lunar eclipse to address the issue of the event having a several-hour duration, whereas solar eclipses last for a maximum of a few minutes. In a variation on the theme, Mark Twain's 1889 novel A Connecticut Yankee in King Arthur's Court depicts a time traveller using an almanac in this way to impress the people in Medieval Britain and become a person of influence. The eclipse prediction motif recurred in fiction until the 1930s or 1940s, by which time it fell out of favour; a late example is Hergé's 1949 Tintin comic Prisoners of the Sun.

Eclipses continued to appear, but much more rarely. In William Lemkin's 1930 short story "The Eclipse Special", scientists construct an aircraft that will allow them to move with the eclipse's path of totality and remain in the Sun's umbra for longer in order to extend the amount of time available to study the eclipse. The same concept appears in John Russell Fearn's 1952 novel The Eclipse Express; astrophysicist Elizabeth Stanway notes that while both stories posit a fictitious eclipse-related force necessary to maintain the required speed, the 1973 Concorde eclipse flight achieved a 74-minute totality through engineering alone. The 1961 film Barabbas portrays the crucifixion darkness during the biblical crucifixion of Jesus as a solar eclipse, and the scene was filmed during the solar eclipse of February 15, 1961. According to science fiction scholar Lisa Yaszek, the decades around the turn of the millennium saw the emergence of a trend wherein marginalized groups "experience a reversal of fortunes when the Moon takes center stage and blots out the Sun".

Some stories depict solar eclipses from other vantage points than the Earth. Nat Schachner's 1940 short story "Cold" describes an eclipse of the Sun by Uranus, as seen from its moon Ariel. Eclipses of other stars, seen from their respective exoplanets, appear in Asimov's 1941 short story "Nightfall", where it results in the first period of darkness in millennia for a planet in a multiple-star system, and the 2000 film Pitch Black, where it unleashes dangerous creatures that dwell in darkness.

=== Sunspots ===
The 11-year solar cycle of sunspot activity appears in a small number of works such as Clifford D. Simak's 1940 short story "Sunspot Purge" and Philip Latham's 1959 short story "Disturbing Sun". In Robert A. Heinlein's 1952 short story "The Year of the Jackpot", this cycle is one of many that herald the end of the world when they align. Hyman Kaner's 1946 novel The Sun Queen is set on a sunspot, where two humans from Earth encounter two factions at war. In science fiction horror films, sunspots are occasionally invoked as the cause of various types of abnormal phenomena such as zombies and mass delusions.

== Close encounters ==
The Sun appears as a hazard to spaceships that approach it too closely in some stories. In John W. Campbell's 1935 short story "Blindness", a scientist studies the Sun at close range in order to solve the mysteries of nuclear energy at great personal cost, only to find that the method for getting there was worth more than the discoveries made. Willy Ley's 1937 short story "At the Perihelion" involves a close approach to the Sun as part of an escape from Mars, and Charles L. Harness's 1949 novel The Paradox Men (a.k.a. Flight into Yesterday) is a space opera that climaxes with a swordfight atop a space station on the surface of the Sun. In Ray Bradbury's 1953 short story "The Golden Apples of the Sun", a crewed solar sample-return mission requires a spaceship to be cooled to near-absolute zero to endure the extreme heat during the critical phase. A fleet of near-Sun spacecraft that modulate the solar output for weather control purposes appears in Theodore L. Thomas's 1962 short story "The Weather Man". David Brin's 1980 novel Sundiver revolves around a hard science fiction journey into the Sun.

== Sentient ==
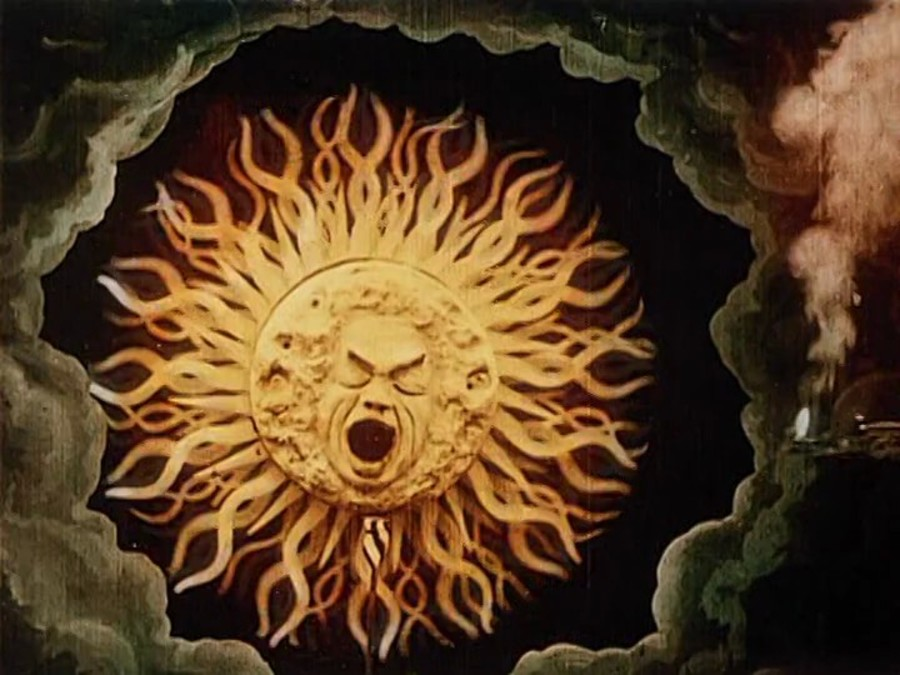
The Sun in the 1904 short film The Impossible Voyage, an early science fiction film by Georges Méliès

Some works depict the Sun as being sentient. According to The Encyclopedia of Science Fiction, this is more commonly applied to other stars; in Olaf Stapledon's 1937 novel Star Maker, all stars are sentient, and in Diana Wynne Jones's 1975 novel Dogsbody, both the Sun and Sirius are sentient. In Gregory Benford and Gordon Eklund's 1977 novel If the Stars are Gods, aliens come to the Solar System to communicate with the Sun. According to The Encyclopedia of Fantasy, the Sun is usually male in fictional mythologies where it is personified, though some exceptions exist such as the legendarium of J. R. R. Tolkien, in whose cosmology it is female. The Sun is likewise female in Alasdair Gray's 1983 short story "The Problem", and concerned with her spots.

== See also ==
- The Sun in culture
- Stars in fiction
- Solar System in fiction

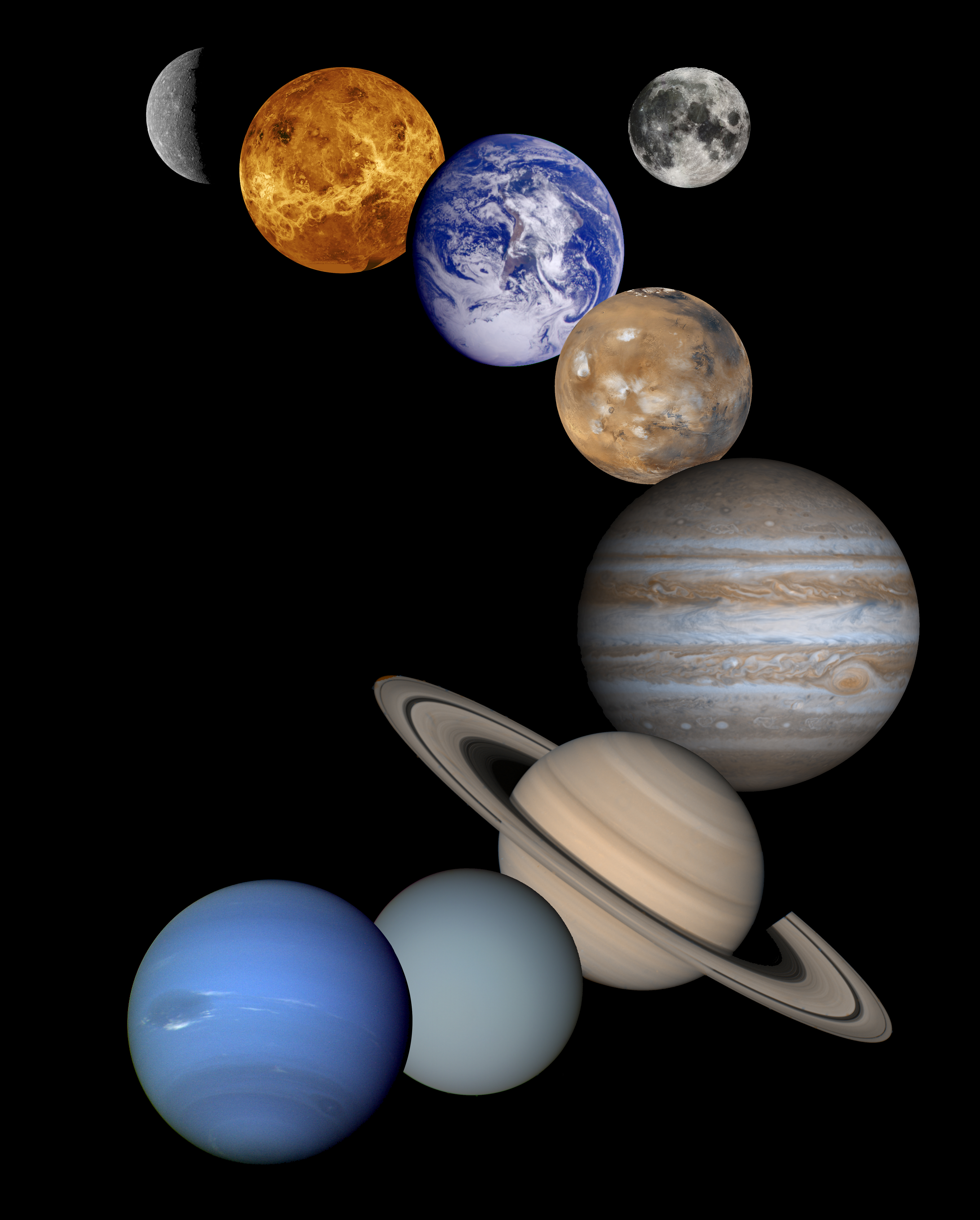
