= Leo Pfeffer =

American lawyer

Leo Pfeffer (December 25, 1910 in Osijek — June 4, 1993 in Goshen, New York) was an American lawyer, constitutional scholar, and humanist who was active in movement for religious freedom in the United States, and was one of leading legal proponents of the separation of church and state.

== Biography ==
Pfeffer was born in Austria-Hungary and in 1912 emigrated to United States with his parents and siblings. After finishing his school, he studied at the City College of New York and after graduation continued in 1930–1933 at the New York University School of Law.

He was raised a Conservative Jew and attended religious services, yet later quipped (in a speech made before Freedom From Religion Foundation) that "the Orthodox consider me to be the worst enemy they've had - since Haman in the Purim story!"

After admission to the Bar Pfeffer had a general law practice in Manhattan from 1933 to 1945. Between 1945 and 1964 he was Legal Adviser of the American Jewish Congress (AJC). In the latter capacity he was known for his adherence to ideas of secular humanism, which he elaborated in number of publications. In addition he was also 1954-1958 lecturer at the New School for Social Research in New York City. Pfeffer became the director of AJC's Commission on Law and Social Action in 1957.

Pfeffer lectured at the New School from 1954 to 1958 and taught at Mount Holyoke College from 1958 to 1960, then at Yeshiva University in 1962 and 1963. He had honorary degrees from Hebrew Union College and Long Island University.

In 1964 Pfeffer became professor of political science at the Long Island University, where he taught until his retirement in 1980. In that period he wrote several books on religious freedom, the separation of religion and state, and the corresponding decisions of the US Supreme Court. After 1964 he also served AJC as special counsel, and did legal work on behalf of other groups, including the Committee for Public Education and Religious Liberty.

For his commitment to civil rights and liberties and his humanistic attitude the American Humanist Association awarded him the prize Humanist of the Year in 1988.

Since 1937 Pfeffer was married to Freda Plotkin. They had two children: Alan Israel Pfeffer and Susan Beth Pfeffer.

== On Separation of Church and State ==
I believe that complete separation of church and state is one of those miraculous things which can be best for religion and best for the state, and the best for those who are religious and those who are not religious. I believe that the history of the First Amendment and also the Constitution itself, which forbids religious tests for public office, have testified to the healthful endurance of a principle which is the greatest treasure the United States has given the world: the principle of complete separation of church and state. I'm here to tell you that that principle is endangered today.

—Leo Pfeffer addressing FFRF in 1985

Pfeffer's book Church, State and Freedom, was called a "masterpiece" and the ultimate sourcebook for the history of the evolution of the all-American principle of the separation of church and state.

Pfeffer called himself a "strict separationist in contrast to what is called 'accommodationist.'"

By account of contemporaries, for most of the 1950s Pfeffer remained the dominant individual force in managing the flow of church-state litigation in state and federal courts intended to test the constitutionality of the religious oath requirement, school, prayer, and Bible reading - a role Pfeffer retained well into the early 1970s. While he was with AJC, Pfeffer argued cases before the Supreme Court and wrote numerous legal briefs. In 1961 he attained wide attention when he argued the case of Torcaso v. Watkins before the Supreme Court that a provision in the Constitution of Maryland requiring an express belief in the existence of God as a condition for the admission to holding of a public office, was unconstitutional. The Supreme Court unanimously ruled in 1961 that states could not compel officeholders to declare a belief in God, striking down a provision of the Maryland Constitution on the ground that it was a "religious test for public office" invading the individual's right to religious freedom.

Pfeffer later pleaded "partly guilty" to inadvertently perpetuating the myth that "secular humanism" is a religion. In defending atheist Roy Torcaso's case challenging a religious test in Maryland to become a notary public, Pfeffer wrote that "there are religions which are not based on the existence of a personal deity." (His examples were ethical culturists, Buddhists and Confucians). "My good friend Justice Black thought that wasn't good enough. He put in the secular humanists. Who told him secular humanism? I didn't have it in my brief! I couldn't sue, because you can't sue a justice of the Supreme Court. But since then I rued the day".

== Bibliography ==
- Church, State and Freedom, Beacon Press, 1953
- The Liberties of an American: The Supreme Court Speaks, Beacon Press, 1956
- Creeds in Competition: A Creative Force in American Culture, New York: Harper and Brothers, 1958 (also: Greenwood Pub Group, 1978, ISBN 9780313203497)
- Honorable Court: A History of the United States Supreme Court, Beacon Press, 1965
- God, Caesar, and Constitution, Beacon Press, 1974, ISBN 9780807044803
- Religious Freedom, National textbook Company, 1977,
- Religion, State and the Burger Court, Prometheus Books, 1984, ISBN 9780879752750
