= Sun in culture =

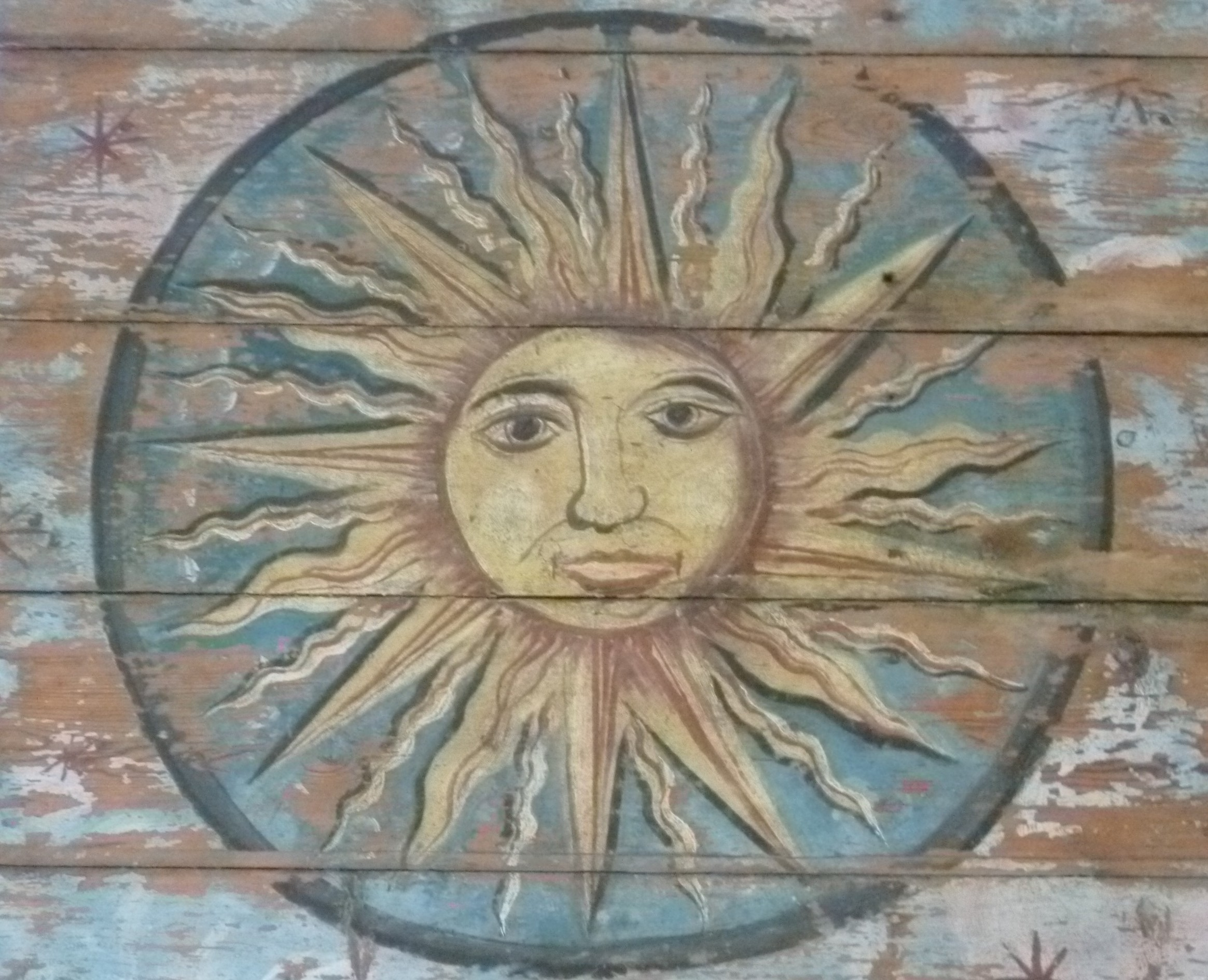
Depiction of the Sun with rays and with a face, a Western iconographic tradition which became current in the Early Modern period (ceiling of the Golden Cross Tavern, Linlithgow, c. 1700)

The Sun, as the source of energy and light for life on Earth, has been a central object in culture and religion since prehistory. Ritual solar worship has given rise to solar deities in theistic traditions throughout the world, and solar symbolism is ubiquitous. Apart from its immediate connection to light and warmth, the Sun is also important in timekeeping as the main indicator of the day and the year.

== Early history ==
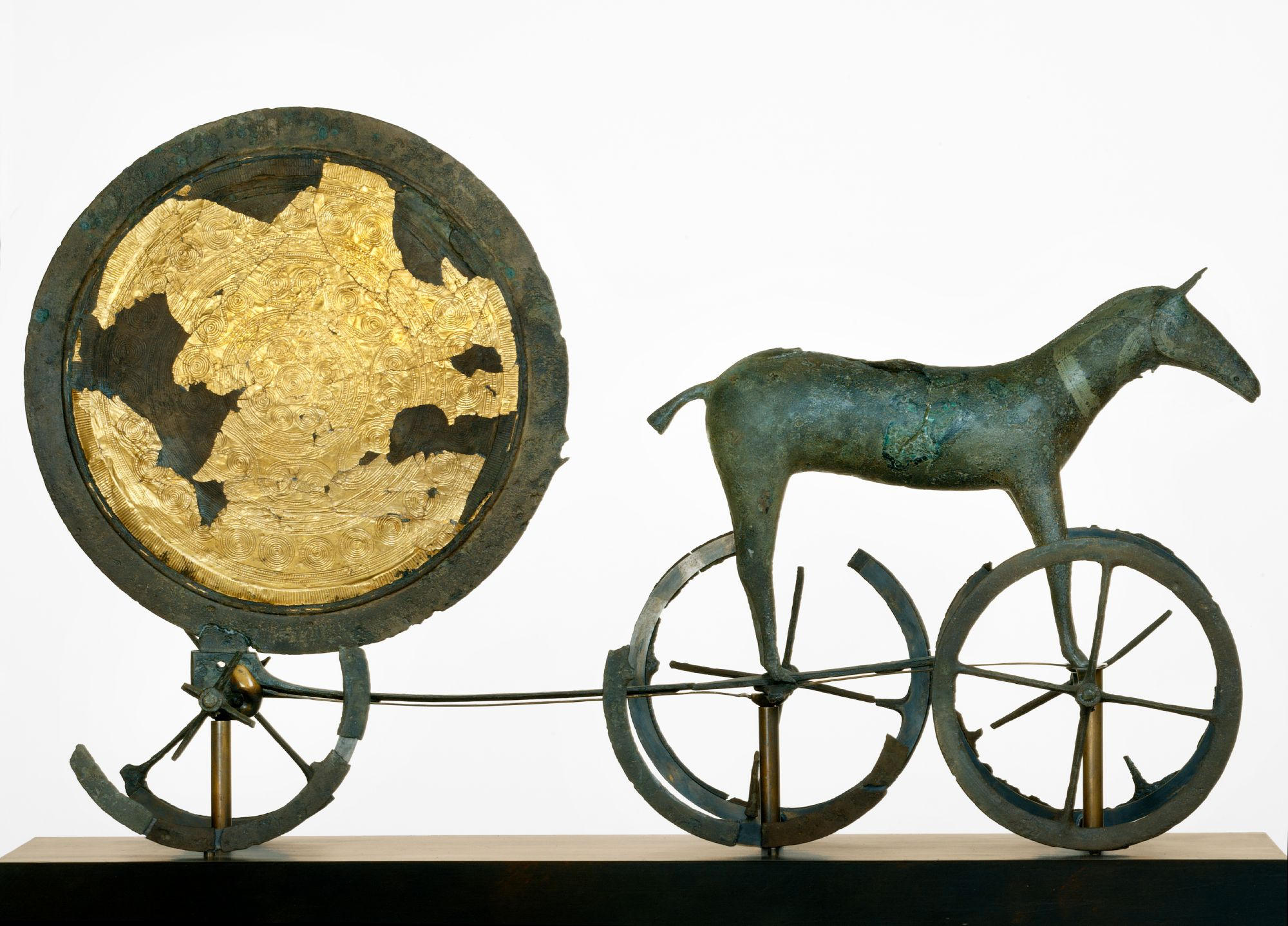
The Trundholm sun chariot (Nordic Bronze Age, c. 1350 BC, National Museum of Denmark).

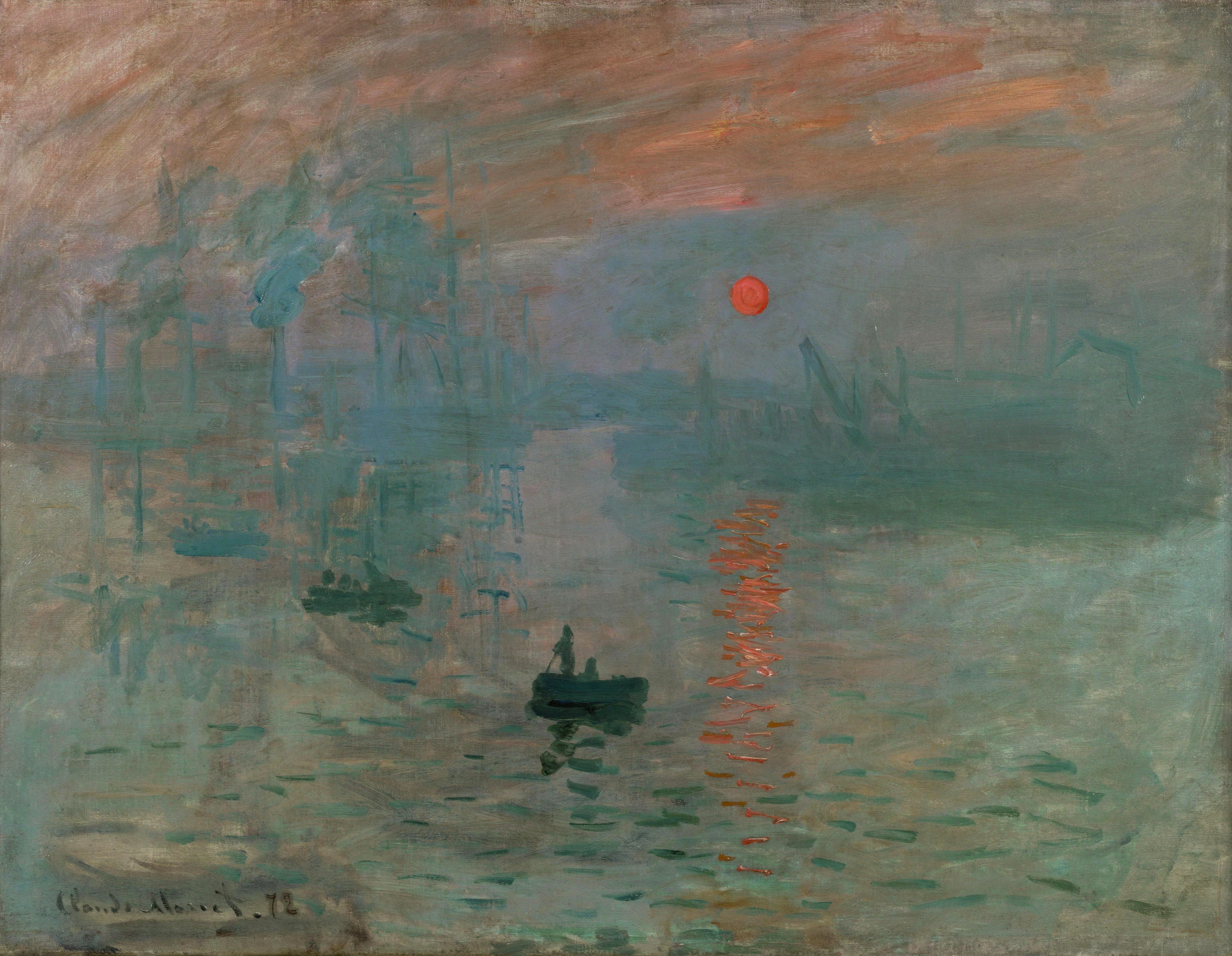
Claude Monet's 1872 painting Impression, Sunrise soon inspired the name of the Impressionism art movement.

There are some artifacts that have been found that depict the Sun as early as the 14th to 26th millennium BC. The earliest understanding of the Sun was that of a disk in the sky, whose presence above the horizon creates day and whose absence causes night. In the Bronze Age, this understanding was modified by assuming that the Sun is transported across the sky in a boat or a chariot, and transported back to the place of sunrise during the night after passing through the underworld.

Many ancient monuments were constructed with the passing of the solar year in mind; for example, stone megaliths accurately mark the summer or winter solstice (some of the most prominent megaliths are in Nabta Playa, Egypt; Mnajdra, Malta and at Stonehenge, England); Newgrange, a prehistoric human-built mount in Ireland, was designed to detect the winter solstice; the pyramid of El Castillo at Chichén Itzá in Mexico is designed to cast shadows in the shape of serpents climbing the pyramid at the vernal and autumnal equinoxes.

== Religious aspects ==
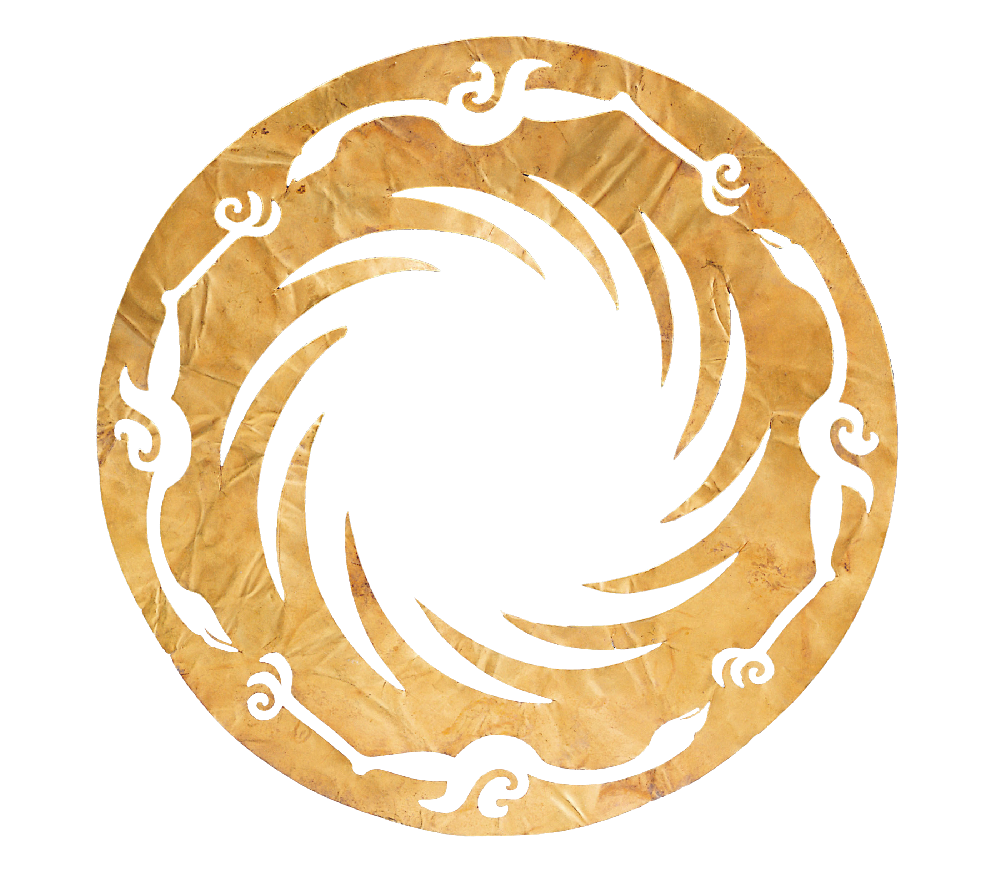
Sun and Immortal Birds Gold Ornament by ancient Shu people. The center is a sun pattern with twelve points around which four birds fly in the same counterclockwise direction. Ancient Kingdom of Shu, coinciding with the Shang dynasty.

Solar deities play a major role in many world religions and mythologies. Worship of the Sun was central to civilizations such as the ancient Egyptians, the Inca of South America and the Aztecs of what is now Mexico. In religions such as Hinduism, the Sun is still considered a god, known as Surya (सूर्य). Many ancient monuments were constructed with solar phenomena in mind; for example, stone megaliths accurately mark the summer or winter solstice (for example in Nabta Playa, Egypt; Mnajdra, Malta; and Stonehenge, England); Newgrange, a prehistoric human-built mount in Ireland, was designed to detect the winter solstice; the pyramid of El Castillo at Chichén Itzá in Mexico is designed to cast shadows in the shape of serpents climbing the pyramid at the vernal and autumnal equinoxes.

The ancient Sumerians believed that the Sun was Utu, the god of justice and twin brother of Inanna, the Queen of Heaven, who was identified as the planet Venus. Later, Utu was identified with the East Semitic god Shamash. Utu was regarded as a helper-deity, who aided those in distress.

From at least the Fourth Dynasty of Ancient Egypt, the Sun was worshipped as the god Ra, portrayed as a falcon-headed divinity surmounted by the solar disk, and surrounded by a serpent. In the New Empire period, the Sun became identified with the dung beetle. In the form of the sun disc Aten, the Sun had a brief resurgence during the Amarna Period when it again became the preeminent, if not only, divinity for the Pharaoh Akhenaton.

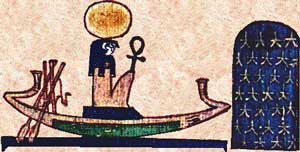
Ra on the solar barque, adorned with the sun-disk

The Egyptians portrayed the god Ra as being carried across the sky in a solar barque, accompanied by lesser gods, and to the Greeks, he was Helios, carried by a chariot drawn by fiery horses. From the reign of Elagabalus in the late Roman Empire the Sun's birthday was a holiday celebrated as Sol Invictus (literally "Unconquered Sun") soon after the winter solstice, which may have been an antecedent to Christmas. Regarding the fixed stars, the Sun appears from Earth to revolve once a year along the ecliptic through the zodiac, and so Greek astronomers categorized it as one of the seven planets (Greek planetes, "wanderer"); the naming of the days of the weeks after the seven planets dates to the Roman era.

In Proto-Indo-European religion, the Sun was personified as the goddess *Seh_{2}ul. Derivatives of this goddess in Indo-European languages include the Old Norse Sól, Sanskrit Surya, Gaulish Sulis, Lithuanian Saulė, and Slavic Solntse. In ancient Greek religion, the sun deity was the male god Helios, who in later times was syncretized with Apollo.

In the Bible, Malachi 4:2 mentions the "Sun of Righteousness" (sometimes translated as the "Sun of Justice"), which some Christians have interpreted as a reference to the Messiah (Christ). In ancient Roman culture, Sunday was the day of the sun god. In paganism, the Sun was a source of life, giving warmth and illumination. It was the center of a popular cult among Romans, who would stand at dawn to catch the first rays of sunshine as they prayed. The celebration of the winter solstice (which influenced Christmas) was part of the Roman cult of the unconquered Sun (Sol Invictus). It was adopted as the Sabbath day by Christians. The symbol of light was a pagan device adopted by Christians, and perhaps the most important one that did not come from Jewish traditions. Christian churches were built so that the congregation faced toward the sunrise.

Tonatiuh, the Aztec god of the sun, was closely associated with the practice of human sacrifice. The sun goddess Amaterasu is the most important deity in the Shinto religion, and she is believed to be the direct ancestor of all Japanese emperors.

== Culture ==
Many Japanese people perceive the sun as ‘red’. This is thought to be due to the influence of the Japanese flag. In contrast, in the West—including the United States—the sun is generally considered to be yellow.

== See also ==
- Solar worship
- Moon in culture
- Eclipses in history and culture
- Solar calendar
- Sun in fiction
