= The Dead and the Gone =

2008 novel by Susan Beth Pfeffer

- First edition cover
- Author: Susan Beth Pfeffer
- Language: English
- Series: The Last Survivors
- Subject: The Moon
- Genre: Young adult novel, Science fiction
- Publisher: Harcourt Children's Books
- Publication date: May 4, 2008
- Publication place: United States
- Media type: Print (hardcover)
- Pages: 321 pp
- ISBN: 978-0-15-206311-5 (first edition, hardcover)
- OCLC: 167492096
- LC Class: PZ7.P44855 Dc 2008
- Preceded by: Life as We Knew It
- Followed by: This World We Live In

The Dead and the Gone is a young adult science fiction dystopian novel by Susan Beth Pfeffer. Released in hardcover in May 2008, it is the second book in The Last Survivors, following Life as We Knew It and preceding This World We Live In and The Shade of the Moon.

== Background ==
Life As We Knew It was created after Pfeffer watched Meteor (1979), noting that "it got [her] thinking about how the people who have the most to lose if the world comes to an end are kids," and wanted to see how her characters would cope with a situation that was out of their control. The Dead and the Gone occurs at the same time as the first novel, Life As We Knew It, but in New York City. She mentioned that "I figure with 300 million people alive in the United States, even if I write about 10 people a book, I can still get another 2,999,998 novels out of that meteor, and that should keep me busy and entertained well past the foreseeable future."

The Dead and the Gone uses a third-person narrative, while Life As We Knew It used a first-person narrative in a journal format. When asked about the change in narrative, Pfeffer stated that in her planning processes, she "just could not envision a teenage boy keeping a diary. It's as simple as that,".

== Plot ==
Alex Morales is a seventeen-year-old Puerto Rican boy living in New York City with his parents and younger sisters, Briana and Julie, with his older brother, Carlos, serving in the Marines. While their father is in Puerto Rico for their grandmother’s funeral, an asteroid hits the Moon and pushes it closer to Earth. Alex’s mother, a nurse, is called to the hospital to help, leaving Alex to watch over Briana and Julie. The next morning, Alex’s uncle Jimmy visits and helps them stock food in their apartments, and when they return home Briana states that she received a call from who she believes is their father and Alex receives a call from Carlos reassuring him that he is okay. Later that day, Alex begins to worry about his parents as a storm hits the city, flooding the subways his mother uses to get to and from work, and a hurricane hits Puerto Rico, where his father is. On Sunday, phone service is restored, and Alex calls the hospital where his mother works, but does not learn of her condition. On Tuesday, Alex’s all-boys Catholic high school reopens and he meets Father Francis Mulrooney, a retired priest who was asked to temporarily act as the school's principal. Later that week, Alex visits Yankee Stadium, where the bodies of the dead are laid out for identification, but does not find anyone he recognizes. Tensions rise in the Morales household as Briana and Julie grow frustrated with the lack of information and they fear they will never see their parents again.

Alex sends Briana to live at an upstate convent, where she will be fed and cared for alongside other Catholic girls. Jimmy and his wife Lorraine leave the city with their children to move to Tulsa and offer to take Julie, but Alex refuses. Around this time, some of their neighbors also leave the city and leave Alex the keys to their apartment for his family to use, and he and Julie raid abandoned apartments in their building for food. In June, Alex and Julie’s schools announce that they will remain open through the summer and provide lunches, and the city begins mandatory evacuations as a new food distribution program begins. As the summer goes on, volcanic eruptions emit gases that block out the sun, causing temperatures to drop dramatically. Alex receives a postcard from Carlos, saying he has been deployed to Texas, and, despite their reluctance, he and his friend Kevin begin engaging in “body shopping”; looting abandoned corpses and selling their belongings for food and supplies.

In September, Briana returns from the convent, having developed asthma from the poor air quality. Feeling guilty for what he has done to feed his sisters and his growing distance from God, Alex approaches Father Mulrooney to confess his sins. Mulrooney assures him that his desire to keep his family alive is righteous and advises him to thank God for what he has when there is so much suffering in the world and to do something to make his sisters happy. Inspired, Alex throws Julie a surprise party for her thirteenth birthday.

One of Alex's schoolmates, who has asthma, warns him that his basement apartment is bad for Briana’s health, and he moves the family to an abandoned upstairs apartment. In October, Julie’s girls-only school closes and its students begin attending Alex’s high school. In November, Harvey, Alex’s supplies dealer, tells him that he can arrange for him and Briana to leave the city, but he must trade Julie away to an anonymous man. Alex refuses, and in desperation visits Robert Flynn, the father of a wealthy former schoolmate, and asks for help in getting his sisters to a safe place. Flynn warns him that the city will only last as long as a full evacuation, and gives him three passes to an unspecified safe location, which Alex hides from his sisters until the day comes for them to leave. In December, while he and Kevin are looting bodies, Kevin dies after being struck by a tree branch.

The day of departure arrives, and the Morales family reaches the designated convoy, only to learn that the departure has been canceled due to a citywide quarantine imposed to prevent the spread of the flu, but the current plan is for buses to leave every two weeks. While waiting for the next convoy date, Alex goes to Harvey’s store and finds that he has died, leaving behind enough food to last until after Christmas. Alex later becomes sick with the flu and his sisters struggle to care for him, but he recovers on his birthday. The next day, he notices that Briana has disappeared from the apartment, and two days after Christmas, the power temporarily returns, and he and Julie find her dead in the elevator, the power having gone out while she was using it.

The next day, Alex returns to his school to light a candle for Briana and meets with Father Mulrooney and one of the nuns, Sister Rita, to confess his feelings of guilt over Briana’s death. Mulrooney tells him that Sister Rita is leaving New York for a religious college in Georgia and that he can help Alex and Julie leave with her. The next day, the siblings leave behind the apartment for good, hopeful of their future.

== Characters ==
Alex Morales: A 17-year-old Puerto Rican boy who is forced to care for Briana and Julie after the impact and blames himself for his supposed inability to help them. He attends a private school on a scholarship, and before the impact worked at a pizza place.

Briana Morales (Bri): Alex's devoutly religious 14-year-old sister, who helps out with cooking and cleaning due to being better at them than him. Alex arranges for her to be sent to a convent in the country, where she can receive education and regular meals. She is brought back to New York some time later, having developed asthma due to the volcanic ash polluting the air. After this, Alex refuses to let her do anything around the house, forcing Julie to help. Because of her religious beliefs, she has faith that their parents are still alive and will return eventually.

Julie Morales: Alex's youngest sister, who 12 years old and later turns 13. She stays with Alex when Bri leaves, and despite their differences, they become closer as they struggle to survive. She gets along well with Bri despite their different religious attitudes, and is close with Carlos. Despite Alex initially considering her to be a spoiled brat, she ultimately copes well with their situation.

Father Mulrooney: The strict headmaster of Alex's private school. Alex finds him to be strict at first, but they become close over time, and Mulrooney later helps him and Julie escape the city.

Sister Rita: Headmaster of Julie and Briana's school, Holy Angels, who, along with Father Mulrooney, helps get Alex and Julie out of New York City.

Isabella Morales (Mami): Alex, Briana, and Julie's mother, who works as a nurse and is presumed dead after the subways are flooded.

Luis Morales (Papi): Alex's father, who, while strict, is loving. He was the superintendent of their apartment building, and the family lives in the basement apartment. He is presumed dead after a hurricane strikes Puerto Rico.

Kevin Daley: Alex's classmate, who connections to the black market and teaches Alex how to "body shop".

Harvey: A man with whom Alex trades items, from body shopping and from other apartments, for food.

Carlos Morales: Alex's 22-year-old brother, who is in the Marines and deployed to Texas.

Chris Flynn: A wealthy boy in Alex's class, who was rivals with Alex before the impact and whose father offers Alex tickets out of the city.

Uncle Jimmy and Aunt Lorraine: Alex's aunt and uncle, who have three young children and are expecting another. They own a bodega, and Jimmy allows Alex and Julie to take some food with them. They later leave New York City to move to Tulsa and offer to take Julie with them.

Father Franco: The priest at Alex's church, who provides solace, shelter, and information.

Tony Loretto and James Flaherty: Alex's schoolmates, who help Alex and Kevin plan a birthday party for Julie and get Briana asthma medication.

== Reception ==
Publishers Weekly described The Dead and the Gone as "riveting", and said that "once again Pfeffer creates tension not only through her protagonist's day-to-day struggles but also through chilling moral dilemmas: whether to rob the dead, whom to save during a food riot, how long to preserve the hope that his parents might return," adding that "[t]he powerful images and wrenching tragedies will haunt readers." John Green of the New York Times said that it "transcend[s] [its] premises with terrifyingly well-imagined futures and superb characterization," and that "the story’s climax and resolution feel achingly right."
