= Ellen Conford =

American novelist

- Born: March 20, 1942; New York City, U.S.
- Died: March 20, 2015 (aged 73); Great Neck, New York, U.S.
- Education: Hofstra College
- Occupation: Writer
- Writing career
- Genres: Children's literature; young adult fiction
- Notable awards: Parents' Choice Award

Ellen Conford (March 20, 1942 – March 20, 2015) was an American author for children and young adults. Among her writings are the Annabel the Actress and Jenny Archer series. Her books have won the Best Book of the Year Citation, Best Book of the International Interest Citation, Best Book of the Year for Children, Parents' Choice Award, and more.

== Early life ==
She was born Ellen Shaffer in New York City in 1942, the only child of Harry Schaffer and Lillian Schaffer (née Pfeffer). She is the first cousin of fellow writer Susan Beth Pfeffer. An avid reader from an early age, she read eight books per week. Among her favorite books to read were the Nancy Drew series and teen romances.

In high school, she edited her school's humor magazine. She attended Hofstra College from 1959 to 1962. During her studies, she helped pay for classes by working as a proofreader and as a salesperson. She met fellow student David Conford, whom she married November 23, 1960.

== Career ==
Upon graduating from college, Conford began her career writing short stories for teen magazines, published between 1969 and 1971 in magazines such as TEEN. She was prompted to begin writing full-length books when she couldn't find a good book for their son Michael to read at the library, and told her husband that she thought she could write a better one.

Her debut book Impossible Possum was published by Little, Brown in 1971 - a picture book about a possum who doesn't fit in with the rest of his family because he can't hang by his tail. The book was illustrated by Rosemary Wells. Little, Brown editor John Keller recalls coming across the manuscript for Impossible Possum at the beginning of his editorial career: "It [was] fresh and funny, tone was just right..." Previously to being acquired by Little, Brown, it had been rejected by 12 other publishers.

Conford went on to publish over 40 books and have a prolific career in children's book publishing. The Alfred G. Graebner Memorial High School of Rules and Regulations was an ALA Notable Young Adult Book in 1976, and Lenny Kandell, Smart Aleck (Little, Brown) was named an SLJ Best Book in 1983.

Several of her stories have been adapted for television, sometimes by Conford herself. Her children's book And This is Laura and the story Revenge of the Incredible Dr. Rancid and His Youthful Assistant, Jeffrey became ABC Weekend Specials, while her young adult novels Dear Lovey Hart, I Am Desperate became an ABC Afterschool Special and The Alfred G. Graebner Memorial High School Handbook of Rules and Regulations was a CBS Schoolbreak Special.

Ellen Conford died at her home in Great Neck, New York on March 20, 2015, her 73rd birthday.

== Bibliography ==
=== Novels ===
- Dreams of Victory (1973)
- Felicia the Critic (1973)
- Me and the Terrible Two (1974)
- The Luck of Pokey Bloom (1975)
- Dear Lovey Hart, I Am Desperate (1975)
- The Alfred G. Graebner Memorial High School Handbook of Rules and Regulations (1976) - ALA Notable Young Adult Book
- And This is Laura (1977)
- Hail, Hail, Camp Timberwood (1978)
- Anything for a Friend (1979)
- We Interrupt This Semester for an Important Bulletin (1979)
- Revenge of the Incredible Dr. Rancid and His Youthful Assistant, Jeffrey (1980)
- Seven Days to a Brand New Me (1981)
- To All My Fans With Love from Sylvie (1982)
- Lenny Kandell, Smart Aleck (1983)
- You Never Can Tell (1984)
- Why Me? (1985)
- Strictly for Laughs (1985)
- A Royal Pain (1986)
- The Things I Did For Love (1987)
- Genie With the Light Blue Hair (1989)
- Loving Someone Else (1991)
- Dear Mom, Get Me Out of Here! (1992)
- My Sister the Witch (1995)
- Norman Newman and the Werewolf of Walnut Street (1995)
- The Frog Princess of Pelham (1997)
- Diary of a Monster's Son (1999)
- Loathe at first sight (2000)
- Annabel the actress (2000)

=== Picture books ===
- Impossible, Possum (1971)
- Why Can't I Be William? (1972)
- Just the Thing for Geraldine (1974)
- Eugene the Brave (1978)

=== Series ===
==== Annabel the Actress ====
- Annabel the Actress: Starring in Gorilla My Dreams (1999)
- Annabel the Actress: Starring in Just a Little Extra (2000)
- Annabel the Actress: Starring In Hound of the Barkervilles (2002)
- Annabel the Actress: Starring in Camping It Up (2004)

==== Jenny Archer ====
- A Job for Jenny Archer (1988)
- A Case for Jenny Archer (1988)
- Jenny Archer, Author (1989)
- What's Cooking, Jenny Archer? (1989)
- Jenny Archer to the Rescue (1990)
- Can Do, Jenny Archer (1992)
- Nibble, Nibble, Jenny Archer (1993)
- Get the Picture Jenny Archer? (1993)

=== Anthologies ===
- Shelf Life: Stories by the Book (2003)

=== Collections ===
- If This is Love, I'll Take Spaghetti (1990)
- 'I Love You, I Hate You, Get Lost (1994)
- Crush (1998)
