= Life as We Knew It (novel) =

2006 science fiction novel by Susan Beth Pfeffer

Life As We Knew It
- Author: Susan Beth Pfeffer
- Series: Life As We Knew It
- Genre: Science fiction
- Publisher: Harcourt Children's Books
- Publication date: October 1, 2006
- Media type: Print (hardback & paperback)
- Pages: 337 pgs
- ISBN: 0-15-205826-5 (first edition, hardcover)
- OCLC: 63705625
- LC Class: PZ7.P44855 Lif 2004
- Followed by: The Dead and the Gone; This World We Live In; The Shade of the Moon

Life As We Knew It is a young adult science fiction novel by American author Susan Beth Pfeffer, first published in 2006 by Harcourt Books. It is the first book in The Last Survivors series, followed by The Dead and the Gone. The book follows a teenage girl named Miranda and her family, who live in northeastern Pennsylvania and struggle to survive after an asteroid hits the Moon and brings it closer to Earth.

== Plot ==
Miranda is a 16-year-old girl who lives in Pennsylvania with her mother, Laura, and her brothers Matt and Jonny, with her worrying about her grades and becoming a godmother to her half-sibling, who her father and his second wife, Lisa, are expecting. Soon, the news focuses on an asteroid which is predicted to hit the Moon. People are excited about the opportunity to witness the event, including Miranda and her family. However, the asteroid is denser than scientists expected, and soon after the impact, it becomes clear that it has pushed the Moon closer to Earth, intensifying the tidal forces that it exerts on it.

After the impact, chaos ensues as tsunamis and earthquakes ravage the coasts, killing countless people. Miranda and her family go shopping to stock up on food, water, and supplies, and soon after Matt comes home from college. While they are safe from tsunamis because they live inland, during the summer tidal forces push magma to the surface and several dormant volcanoes erupt, filling the sky with ash. This causes temperatures to drop dramatically, making it difficult for plants to grow. As conditions become harsher, the family begins to eat less to conserve food, and Laura makes sacrifices to give Jonny, whom Miranda believes she considers to be the strongest of her children, a chance at survival, causing conflict between her and Miranda. Her father and his new wife Lisa, who is pregnant, leave the area and travel west hoping to make contact with his mother and her parents, but they are able to stop with Miranda and her family for a few days before heading out.

During winter, the family also deals with snow and a lack of running water, natural gas, or electricity. Miranda's first brush with death is her friend Megan, who dies from starvation, and Megan's mother, who hangs herself as a result. Later, she finds an elderly neighbor and old family friend they'd been keeping a watch on dead, but they are able to sustain their own food sources from her stockpile. As an outbreak of influenza spreads through town and kills many people, including Peter, a doctor whom Laura was in a relationship with, Miranda, who did not fall ill, nurses her family back to health.

As their food supply is about to run out, Miranda ventures into town, which she claims is to see if there has been a letter from her father and Lisa, though in reality she knows that she is dying of starvation and intends to die away from home to spare her family from having to watch her die. Miranda finds the post office abandoned, and as she is about to let the cold kill her, she notices a yellow piece of paper that leads her to the town hall, where the mayor is handing out bags of food. Her family is given four bags of food and promised to be given more in the following weeks. With a renewed will to live, on her seventeenth birthday Miranda reflects on why she keeps a diary, wondering if it is for the people who might read it in the future or for herself, to help her process life.

== Reception ==
Kirkus Reviews said that "death is a constant threat, and Pfeffer instills despair right to the end but is cognizant to provide a ray of hope with a promising conclusion. Plausible science fiction with a frighteningly realistic reminder of recent tragedies here and abroad." Ilene Cooper said in her review for Booklist that "each page is filled with events both wearying and terrifying and infused with honest emotions. Pfeffer bring's cataclysmic tragedy very close."

== Awards ==
Pfeffer's book was named Young Adult Library Services Association's Best Books for Young Adults in 2007, and shortlisted for the Andre Norton Award for Outstanding Science Fiction or Fantasy Book of 2007. In addition, it won the Booklist Editor's Choice Award for Books for Youth (Older Reader's Category) in 2006. It was nominated for the 2009 Rebecca Caudill Young Readers' Book Award and won the Truman Readers Award of 2009.
