= Omega: The Last Days of the World =

1894 novel by Camille Flammarion

- Author: Camille Flammarion
- Original title: La Fin du monde
- Genre: Science fiction
- Publisher: Ernest Flammarion (Paris); The Cosmopolitan Publishing Company (New York)
- Publication date: 1894
- English publication date: 1894
- ISBN: 0-8032-6898-X (1999 reprint)
- OCLC: 40396597
- Dewey Decimal: 843/.8 21
- LC Class: PQ2244.F9 F513 1999

Omega: The Last Days of the World (French: La Fin du monde) is a science fiction novel published in 1894 by Camille Flammarion.

In the 25th century, a newly discovered comet, made mostly of Carbonic-Oxide (CO), could potentially collide with the Earth. The novel is concerned with the philosophy and political consequences of the end of the world.

== Film version ==
In 1931, French director Abel Gance released his film adaptation of La Fin du monde, known in English as End of the World.

== See also ==
- Comets in fiction
