= Susan Beth Pfeffer =

American author (1948–2025)

- Born: February 17, 1948; New York City, U.S.
- Died: June 23, 2025 (aged 77); Monroe, New York, U.S.
- Education: New York University
- Occupation: Author
- Parent(s): Leo Pfeffer; Freda Plotkin
- Writing career
- Period: 1968–2013
- Genres: Young adult fiction; science fiction; children's literature
- Notable work: Life as We Knew It (2006)
- Notable awards: Dorothy Canfield Fisher Children's Book Award (1979); Buxtehude Bull (2010)

Susan Beth Pfeffer (February 17, 1948 – June 23, 2025) was an American author best known for young adult and science fiction. After writing for 35 years, she received wider notice for her series of post-apocalyptic novels, "The Last Survivors" series, some of which appeared on The New York Times Best Seller list.

== Life and career ==
Pfeffer was born in Manhattan, New York City, on February 17, 1948, the daughter of Leo Pfeffer, a lawyer and professor, and his wife, Freda née Plotkin, a secretary. She was the first cousin of fellow children's book author Ellen Conford. Pfeffer's family lived in Queens before moving to the suburbs of Nassau County, New York. She began writing stories as a child.

She published her first book, Just Morgan, in 1970, while she was a senior at New York University. After college, she moved to Middletown, New York, and continued to write full-time. She published more than 75 books.

Pfeffer's books cover the range of children's literature from picture books to young-adult novels. They include biographies for younger readers, and both historical, such as the Portraits of Little Women series, and contemporary fiction. She also wrote a book for adults about how to write for children. About David (1980) and The Year Without Michael (1987) are two of her books that received critical notice. Pfeffer said that she enjoyed writing about family dynamics. Pfeffer achieved wider notice with her 2006 book Life as We Knew It, a bestseller. This became the first of her Moon Crash series. Pfeffer cited the film Meteor as inspiration for the Last Survivors series.

Pfeffer died from endometrial cancer at her home in Monroe, New York, on June 23, 2025, at the age of 77.

== Works ==
- Just Morgan (1970)
- Better Than All Right (1972)
- Rainbows & Fireworks (1973)
- The Beauty Queen (1974)
- Whatever Words You Want to Hear (1974)
- Marly the Kid (1975)
- Kid Power (1977)
- Starring Peter and Leigh (1979)
- Awful Evelina (1979; picture book)
- About David (1980)
- Just Between Us (1980)
- What Do You Do When Your Mouth Won't Open? (1981)
- Starting with Melodie (1982)
- A Matter of Principle (1982)
- Courage, Dana (1983)
- Truth or Dare (1984)
- Kid Power Strikes Back (1984)
- Fantasy Summer (1984)
- Make Me a Star series (1985–1986)
- Getting Even (1986)
- The Friendship Pact (1986)
- The Year Without Michael (1987)
- Thea at Sixteen (1988)
- Rewind to Yesterday (1988)
- Evvie at Sixteen (1988; Sebastian Sisters series)
- Turning Thirteen (1988)
- Future Forward (1989)
- Claire at Sixteen (1989)
- Sybil at Sixteen (1989)
- Head of the Class (1989)
- Dear Dad, Love Laurie (1989)
- April Upstairs (1990)
- Most Precious Blood (1990)
- Meg at Sixteen (1990)
- Darcy Downstairs (1990)
- Twin Surprises (1991; picture book)
- Family of Strangers (1992)
- Twin Troubles (1992; picture book)
- Make Believe (1993)
- The Ring of Truth (1993)
- The Riddle Streak (1993)
- Twice Taken (1994)
- Sara Kate, Superkid (1994)
- Nobody's Daughter (1995)
- Sara Kate Saves the World (1995)
- The Pizza Puzzle (1996)
- The Trouble With Wishes (1996)
- Meg's Story (1997; Portraits of Little Women series)
- Jo's Story (1997)
- Beth's Story (1997)
- Amy's Story (1997)
- Justice for Emily (1997)
- Meg Makes a Friend (1998)
- Jo Makes a Friend (1998)
- Beth Makes a Friend (1998)
- Amy Makes a Friend (1998)
- Devil's Den (1998)
- A Gift for Meg (1999)
- A Gift for Beth (1999)
- A Gift for Jo (1999)
- A Gift for Amy (1999)
- Revenge of the Aztecs (2000)
- Blood wounds (2011)

=== The Last Survivors Series ===
- Life as We Knew It (2006), Harcourt Children's Books ISBN 0-15-205826-5.
- The Dead and the Gone (2008), Harcourt Children's Books ISBN 978-0-15-206311-5.
- This World We Live In (2010), Harcourt Children's Books ISBN 978-0-547-24804-2.
- The Shade of the Moon (2013), Harcourt Children's Books, ISBN 978-0-547-81337-0.

== Awards ==
Pfeffer's books have won the Dorothy Canfield Fisher Children's Book Award, the Buxtehude Bull prize and been named on American Library Association Best Books for Young Adults (2007) and Teens’ Top Ten Booklist in 2007. She was a finalist for the Andre Norton Award, Quill Awards and Hal Clement Award.

== Sources ==
- Crossen, C. (October 24, 2008). "Adviser: Dear Booklover". Wall Street Journal (Eastern Edition). p. W.2. Retrieved April 6, 2010, from ABI/INFORM Global.
- Goodnow, C. (December 18, 2008). "Profits of Doom: Teen Readers are eating up Post-Apocalyptic Tales". Seattle Post - Intelligencer. p. B.1. Retrieved April 6, 2010, from Business Dateline.
- John, G. (2008). "Scary New World". New York Times Book Review. p. 30. Retrieved via EBSCOhost database, April 6, 2010.
- "Must-Reads Blend Fright, Fun". (January 26, 2009). The Washington Post. p. B.2. Retrieved April 6, 2010, from Business Dateline.
- Springen, K. (February 2010). "Apocalypse Now". Publishers Weekly. p. 21. Retrieved April 6, 2010, from ABI/INFORM Global.
- Woolingtons, R. (March 11, 2010). "Book Wars Come to High School. The popular reading competition opens to older students". The Register - Guard. p. L.1. Retrieved April 6, 2010, from Business Dateline.
- Young Adult Library Services Association. "Best Book for Young Adults 2007". American Library Association. Retrieved from web, April 6, 2010.
- Young Adult Library Services Association. (2007). "Teens' Top Ten Booklist". American Library Association. Retrieved from web, April 6, 2010.
