= The Torch (novel) =

1948 novel by Jack Bechdolt

- Dust-jacket from the first edition
- Author: Jack Bechdolt
- Illustrator: Robert Tschirky
- Cover artist: Robert Tschirky
- Language: English
- Genre: Science fiction novel
- Publisher: Prime Press
- Publication date: 1948
- Publication place: United States
- Media type: Print (hardback)
- Pages: 229 pp
- OCLC: 3047692

The Torch is a science fiction novel by author Jack Bechdolt. It was first published in book form in 1948 by Prime Press in an edition of 3,000 copies. The novel was originally serialized in the magazine Argosy in January 1920. It has recently been reprinted by Steeger Books in their "Argosy Library" series in 2019

== Plot introduction ==
The novel is set in the year 3010, in the ruins of New York after a comet has devastated the Earth. Fortune is the captain of the army of the Towermen, those who live in the remaining skyscrapers and rule the city with an iron hand. He is taken captive by the people of the Island of the Statue. There, Fortune learns of a prophecy that states that the people will be free when the torch burns in the hands of the statue. Fortune is redeemed by his captors and leads them in a revolt against his former masters.
