= This World We Live In =

Young adult novel by Susan Beth Pfeffer

- Author: Susan Beth Pfeffer
- Series: The Last Survivors
- Genre: Science fiction
- Publisher: Harcourt Children's Books
- Publication date: April 1, 2010
- Media type: Print (hardback & paperback)
- Pages: 256 pgs
- ISBN: 0547248040 (first edition, hardcover)
- Preceded by: The Dead and the Gone
- Followed by: The Shade of the Moon

This World We Live In is a young adult science fiction novel by American author Susan Beth Pfeffer, first published in 2010 by Harcourt Books. It is the third book in The Last Survivors series, being a sequel to The Dead and the Gone and Life as We Knew It. It was followed in 2013 by The Shade of the Moon, which concluded the series.

== Background ==
In the afterword of The Shade of the Moon, Pfeffer states that she did not intend to continue the series after The Dead and the Gone until her publisher contacted her for a sequel featuring the characters of both books. Earlier drafts of this book ranged different in terms of tone, the first of which disregarding the Evans family as a whole and focusing instead on a travelling vaudeville troupe. Another separate, later draft of the book would be set eighteen years after the previous two books and focus on a teenage Gabriel struggling to reach Pennsylvania to reunite with his half-siblings. In the final draft, he appears as an infant.

== Plot ==
A year after an asteroid collided with the Moon and pushed it closer to Earth, Miranda is awakened in the middle of the night by the sound of rain for the first time in months. She and her brothers begin collecting rainwater, and, worried about the stability of their food supply, Matt and Jon decide to embark on a week-long fishing trip on the Delaware River. In preparation, the siblings raid abandoned houses to stock up on essentials. Matt and Jon leave for the trip, and Miranda and her mother, Laura, prepare to store the fish in the flooded basement.

Jon and Matt return from their trip alongside a young woman named Syl, and Jon explains that they met her in a deserted motel after Matt protected her from an abusive partner and that they exchanged marriage vows the next day, making her his wife. On the one-year anniversary of the impact, the boys leave for another fishing trip and Syl suggests that they make an offering to Diana. Miranda sacrifices an old trophy, Laura her first book contract, and Syl her long hair.

In June, Miranda’s father Hal suddenly arrives at the house with Lisa and their newborn son Gabriel, along with a man named Charlie and Alex and Julie Morales. The group met at an evacuation camp and began traveling together, but Alex claims that he plans to go to an Ohio monastery after dropping Julie off at a convent in upstate New York, which he had previously sent Briana to. The next day, Miranda overhears Laura and Matt arguing about how to provide for everyone and learns that Hal and Lisa offered to take Miranda with them when they visited months ago, but Laura refused.

Soon after, the newcomers move into Mrs. Nesbitt’s house and sign up for the food program by pretending to be part of her family. While Miranda and Alex are out raiding houses, they begin to bond romantically, and she hopes that he will stay with her if he knows that Julie is safe at the convent. Alex reveals to her that he has sleeping pills to kill Julie with if there comes a point where killing her would be merciful.

Alex, Julie, Hal and Miranda reach the New York convent and find that all but one of the nuns have left or died. On the way back to Pennsylvania, the van dies and they are forced to walk home. During an argument, Jon reveals that Julie told him that Alex has three passes to a safe city in an unknown location that he does not plan to use. While looting houses with Miranda, he admits that he has given up on going to the monastery and asks her to marry him and go to Pittsburgh with him and Julie. Miranda later interrogates Syl and learns of a safe town in Tennessee at the former Sexton University. Miranda goes to Alex with the information and they reveal the existence of the town to the rest of the extended family. They begin to make plans for Lisa, Julie, and Gabriel to live in the safe town, while Alex, Miranda, and Hal live outside the town as part of its workforce, and everyone else stays behind in Pennsylvania

As Alex and Miranda prepare for the journey and she agrees to marry him in Tennessee, a tornado strikes and Alex leaves to warn Julie and Jon, who are looking for food. At Hal and Lisa’s house, Miranda finds Alex’s passes and pills and hides in a storage closet. When the tornado passes, Miranda is trapped but able to communicate with Lisa and Charlie as they hide in the cellar. While trapped, Charlie suffers a heart attack and dies. Eventually, Hal is able to free Miranda and she realizes that the houses are mostly destroyed as the others free Lisa and Gabriel. Jon returns and says that Julie was injured during the storm and is now paralyzed from the neck down. Laura realizes that Julie will likely die from her injury and focuses on making her comfortable when Hal and Matt take her home.

With Alex still missing, Miranda now considers herself to be part of Julie’s family. While everyone else works to free Lisa, Miranda stays with Julie and, remembering what Alex had planned, gives her the sleeping pills and smothers her to death with a pillow. The next day, Lisa and Gabriel emerge from the cellar and the family mourns Julie's death. After being missing for three days, Alex finally returns and is informed that Julie has died, with everyone believing she died from her injury, and is comforted by the fact that she did not die alone. With their home destroyed, the rest of the family decides to go to the safe town in Tennessee with the others, who had already planned to go there. As everyone prepares to leave, Miranda reflects that she will eventually have to tell Alex that she killed Julie, but hopes that he can forgive her. Miranda decides to leave her diaries behind in the house and the surviving family members leave for Tennessee together.

== Characters ==
Miranda Evans: A 17-year-old girl and the protagonist of Life as We Knew It. At the start of the novel, she lives with her mother and brothers in Pennsylvania and receives weekly food deliveries.

Alejandro "Alex" Morales: The 18-year-old protagonist of The Dead and the Gone. Since the events of the book, he briefly reunited with his brother Carlos in Texas, who advised him to take Julie to the New York convent.

Julie Morales: Alex's 13-year-old sister, who he is deeply protective of. Throughout the novel, she and Jon become romantically involved.

Laura Evans: Matt, Miranda, and Jon's mother.

Matthew "Matt" Evans: Miranda's older brother, who was in college when the asteroid hit the moon.

Jon Evans: Miranda's 14-year-old brother.

Syl: A young woman who Matt marries. Syl is not her birth name, as she named herself after Sylvia Plath. After learning her family died, she spent some time traveling in bands around the country before breaking up with an abusive partner.

Harold "Hal" Evans: Matt, Miranda, and Jon's father and Laura's ex-husband.

Lisa Evans: Miranda's stepmother. Since she is nursing Gabriel, the family is willing to give up food to ensure her health.

Gabriel Evans: Lisa and Hal's newborn son, who was born on Christmas.

Charlie Rutherford: A friend of Lisa and Hal, who they met in an evacuation camp and began traveling with.

== Reception ==
Kirkus Reviews gave This World We Live In a mixed review, stating that "The author once again creates an extremely satisfying blend of human drama and action. Grimly frightening imagery and spot-on depiction of day-to-day bleakness are emotionally potent", but "Given the circumstances, it is believable that their relationship would be rushed, but the initial antagonistic tone set up between them still seems too easily resolved, resulting in a formulaic feel." Publishers Weekly declared that "Pfeffer masterfully evokes the cold, colorless world in which her characters reside" where "hope is never completely extinguished". In a positive review, the website The Books Smugglers gave the book an eight out of ten rating, though noted that it wasn't as strong as its predecessors.
