= Jack Bechdolt =

American writer and journalist (1884–1954)

John Ernest Bechdolt
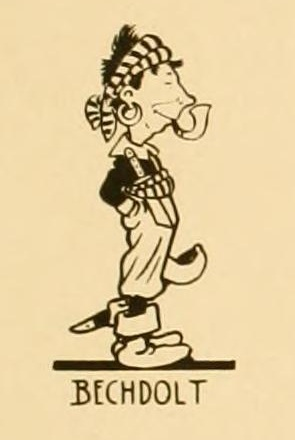
- Jack Bechdolt of the Seattle Cartoonists' Club shown in caricature, in the club's 1911 book The Cartoon; A Reference Book of Seattle's Successful Men. The club made its members look like pirates.
- Born: July 13, 1884; Mankato, Minnesota, U.S.
- Died: December 28, 1954 (aged 70); Pinebluff, North Carolina, U.S.
- Occupations: Novelist; short story writer; journalist
- Spouse: Mabel G.
- Writing career
- Pen name: Jack Bechdolt
- Genres: Science fiction, Fantasy

John Ernest Bechdolt (July 13, 1884 – December 28, 1954) was an American short story writer, novelist, and journalist. He wrote under the name Jack Bechdolt as well as his full name. He worked for the Seattle Post-Intelligencer from 1909 to 1916, after which he moved to New York City, where he worked for Munsey Publications for a year before freelancing. His first novel, The Torch, was serialized in the magazine Argosy in 1920. Several of his stories were adapted into films.

Image taken from The Cartoon; A Reference Book of Seattle's Successful Men by Jack Bechdolt, listed in the book as a member of the Seattle Cartoonists' Club. The man in the background is Seattle businessman F. S. Roddy.

Bechdolt served as a solicitor for the Seattle Post-Intelligencer in 1910. During that time, he was also drawing; he was listed as a member of the Seattle Cartoonists' Club in their 1911 book The Cartoon; A Reference Book of Seattle's Successful Men. He signed one of the illustrations in the book, a caricature of a painter.

Bechdolt was born in Mankato, Minnesota. His father, Adolph F. Bechdolt (1846–1938), was an educator and university professor. His older brother, Frederick R. Bechdolt (1874–1950), was also a journalist and writer. Bechdolt died on December 28, 1954, at Pinebluff Sanitarium in Pinebluff, North Carolina. He was buried in Southern Pines, North Carolina.

== Books ==
- The Front-Page Girl (1929)
- The Lost Vikings (1931)
- The Vanishing Hounds (1941)
- ‘’Junior Air Raid Wardens’’ (1942)
- The Torch (1948)
- On the Air: A Story of Television, a novel (E. P. Dutton, 1950)
- The Modern Handy Book for Boys (1933)
