= The Voyages of Lord Seaton to the Seven Planets =

1765 novel by Marie-Anne de Roumier-Robert

- Author: Marie-Anne de Roumier-Robert
- Language: French
- Genre: Science fiction
- Publication date: 1765
- Publication place: France

The Voyages of Lord Seaton to the Seven Planets is a 1765 romantic utopian novel by Marie-Anne de Roumier-Robert. In the form of travel literature through the Solar System, this novel addresses innovative feminist themes for the time.

== Summary ==
Marie-Anne Robert describes a journey made by a heroine, Monime, guided by a genius named Zachiel. This initiatory journey which takes her into space to visit seven planets is supposed to teach her the skills she needs for her royal destiny.

== Analysis ==
The novel is a bildungsroman in which the heroine tours the solar system. She discovers people who demonstrate different failings of humanity, such as frivolity, a taste for war, a taste for money or the cult of science. Her journey takes her to Saturn where she discovers an ideal, hardworking and caring society.

Guided by feminist ideas, Marie-Anne Robert deplores female ignorance, at the origin of the submission of women in society. She describes an egalitarian society established on Venus, where the education of women allowed them to occupy all public positions.

At the end of her journey, Monime, grown by her experience and her wisdom, decides to return to Earth to recover her father's throne. Marie-Anne Robert thus demonstrates that women are completely equal to men in their capacity to achieve great deeds through their will and courage, contrary to the beliefs of contemporary thinkers. The emancipation of women no longer becomes an obscure and guilt-inducing idea, but rather a force which must lead to a utopian society.
