= Evolution (Baxter novel) =

2002 anthology by Stephen Baxter

- First edition cover
- Author: Stephen Baxter
- Language: English
- Genre: Science fiction novel
- Publisher: Orion Publishing Group
- Publication date: 2002
- Publication place: United Kingdom
- Media type: Print (hardback & paperback)
- Pages: 592 (DelRey Hardcover ed.)
- ISBN: 0-575-07342-X (first edition, paperback) & ISBN 0-575-07341-1 (hardback edition)
- OCLC: 50527130

Evolution is a collection of short stories that work together to form an episodic science fiction novel by author Stephen Baxter. It follows 565 million years of human evolution, from shrewlike mammals 65 million years in the past to the ultimate fate of humanity and its descendants, both biological and non-biological, 500 million years in the future.

== Plot ==
=== Protagonists in the Purga–human line ===
Characters listed below descend from Purga and are either ancestral to or descended from humans.

Purga (65 Mya, Montana). A female Purgatorius. Despite being a shrew-like insectivore and barely self-aware, she is ancestral to all primates. After losing two mates and their litters to a Troodon attack and cannibalism, she manages to bear two pups. They witness the Chicxulub impact, although one of the pups is cooked alive and her mate succumbs to hypothermia. Purga and her surviving pup eventually arrive at a shore, where other Purgatorius are feeding on a dying Ankylosaurus. Her pup joins them but Purga, now elderly and satisfied that her offspring will survive, retreats and dies in her burrow. Her fossilized tooth is discovered by Joan Useb in 2010.

Plesi (63 Mya, North America). A female plesiadapid. Although Earth is lush again, her species still looks very similar to Purgatorius. She has two pups and one of them is killed by an Oxyclaenus.

Noth (51 Mya, Ellesmere Island). A 2-year-old Notharctus male living with its herd in the Arctic forests. His species is lemur-looking, matriarchal and far more social, but still lacks a theory of mind. Noth wanders for weeks with his sister, surviving an attack on their family by a sociopathic fellow, Solo. They eventually find another herd, whose leader accepts Noth and his sister for defeating Solo and allows them to mate with the rest of the herd.

Capo (5 Mya, North African coast). A 40-year-old australopithecine dominant male living in the dry Mediterranean basin. His species has occasional consciousness, basic bipedalism, instinctive toolmaking and a theory of mind, but is incapable of teaching. As his forest is shrinking, Capo leads part of his group to a larger one, despite being ill-suited to cross the plains in between. However, it is already claimed by a bigger clan of their species and they are forced to live in the open plains and feed on carcasses.

Far (1.5 Mya, Rift Valley). A 9-year-old female hominid living with her tribe in the savannah. Her species is now fully bipedal and omnivorous, as well as surviving past their reproductive age to take important social roles. Forced by a grassland fire to take refuge in a jungle, she survives an attack by pithecines and eventually joins another hominid tribe, who use axes much to her amazement. She invents body painting while playing with ocher, allowing her to court a young male and be accepted by the group.

Pebble (127 kya, Central Kenya). An 8-year-old neanderthal male. After his tribe is attacked, he leads the survivors and settle in the Mediterranean coast years later. There he meets Harpoon, a female modern human (Homo sapiens sapiens). Her tribe has more sophisticated huts and tools, as well as clothing and domesticated wolves. Trading seafood for tools, both tribes come together and Pebble and Harpoon mate. After swimming afloat logs to a nearby island, they exterminate the last Homo erectus there.

Mother or Ja-ahn (60 kya, Sahara). A 30-year-old woman living in the savannah. Schizophrenia allows her to understand causality, invent the spear-thrower and form simple sentences, which are quickly learned by the rest of her tribe. When her son dies, Mother murders her aunt believing that she was responsible through unseen means. The incident originates superstition and Mother is regarded as a sage. Two more members are sacrificed due to Mother's superstitions about blood and rain in an attempt to solve the drought. She eventually dies of cancer and is named Ja-ahn after their language's word for "mother", becoming the first human with a proper name, as well becoming mythicized.

Ejan (52 kya, Indonesia). A 20-year-old man. His people are the most ancient characters in the novel that speak normally. He lives with his ill mother in an increasingly crowded village. Ejan carves a canoe with his sister to sail to the southern landmass, becoming the first humans to set foot in Australia. Over the next millennium, people migrate there and the siblings become mythicized.

Jana (51 kya, Northwestern Australia). A 21-year-old man. He tries to court a girl but is not allowed to by her brothers due to his polio-struck leg. To hunt large game, he invents setting forests on fire and manages to trap a Genyornis. He returns with its head, impressing the village.

Jo'on (47 kya, New South Wales). A 40-year-old man partnered with Leda, a 39-year-old woman. As Leda's brother uses flint to hunt better than with spears, she asks Jo'on to go the coast to obtain some.

Jahna (31 kya, Western France). A girl living in a settlement during the Ice Age. Her people's village, cognitive capacity and culture are more sophisticated than those of neanderthals, which they often abuse and exploit. While hunting, Jahna and her brother get lost when an ice storm breaks. Days later, they take shelter in the cave of a massive, 40-year-old neanderthal male, "Old Man". Though superficially dangerous and unable to speak, Old Man takes care of them. However, a team led by their father eventually finds them and bludgeons Old Man in his sleep, amidst the children's protests.

Juna (9.6 kya, Anatolia). A pregnant 15-year-old girl living in a famine-struck hunter-gatherer village. She accepts to become the slave of Cahl, the beer trader, to save her unborn child from being killed at birth. At Cahl's hometown, Juna learns about agriculture and is put to work in the fields. Although food is plenty, monoculture means that the villagers' diet and health are poorer than those of hunter-gatherers. When tribute-collector Keram arrives, Juna learns about the city of Cata Huuk, and convinces him that she was kidnapped from there long ago. In part due to her healthier appearance, Keram takes her with him, despite Cahl's protests. Cata Huuk is Earth's first city, and its leader, the Potus, the first king. Juna is made to dance naked for the Potus, and eventually partners up with Keram. He gives birth to her child and then Keram's. After four years of plenitude, famine-caused revolts force the family to flee Cata Huuk. Along the way, Keram brings Juna to the ruins of her original and now measles-struck village, where she finds her sister as the sole survivor.

Athalaric (482 CE, Rome). The son of a barbarian slave, under the tutelage and in charge of the protection of Honorius, a venerable Roman bone collector. Visiting a decaying Rome, the Persian trader Papak convinces them to join a Scythian collector in Petra. There, Honorius becomes so excited after acquiring a Homo erectus skull that he invites the entire group to a museum in Rome, where they misidentify a Protoceratops as a griffin. Honorius is confident that the remains prove that living beings were radically different in the past. Away on a cave expedition, Athalaric asks Honorius to become a priest on his father's request, to lead Rome away from decay. Honorius however is not interested and is murdered by the henchmen of Athalaric's father. His remains are buried next to Old Man's.

Joan Useb (21st century). A paleontologist of San and European ancestry. In 2031, she is pregnant and flying to a conference in Rabaul on global warming, where she meets primatologist Alyce Sigurdardottir and Bex Scott, the genetically enhanced daughter of celebrity scientist Alison Scott. As protesters from the "Fourth World" disrupt the conference, the Rabaul caldera erupts, setting the sequence of events that collapse civilization. In the epilogue, set in 2049, a 52-year-old Joan and her 18-year-old daughter Lucy rescue feral children left behind in the Galápagos Islands due to the ensuing wars and toxic rain. Reflecting on humanity's bleak future, Lucy asks Joan whether she has been happy and she responds affirmatively, based on the fact that unlike their ancestors, they have a glimpse into the past and can be certain that some form of life will survive into the far future.

Robert Wayne "Snowy" Snow (millennia in the future, United Kingdom). A 31-year-old male military officer, genetically modified to facilitate cryogenic sleep. During the post-Rabaul wars, the United Nations deploys military officers in suspended animation worldwide to deter international invasions. Centuries later, officers Snowy, Ahmed, Sidewise, Bonner and Moon awaken and soon realize that human civilization has long collapsed. Ahmed, the leader, attempts to rebuild civilization, but with Moon being the only female, crops being long extinct and not knowing how to recreate even the most basic technology, Sidewise and Bonner agree that Ahmed's plan is completely unrealistic. A month later, Snowy discovers that there actually are humans, now feral and without language. Internal conflicts distance Sidewise and Bonner, Moon disappears, Ahmed succumbs to mercury poisoning from fish, and Snowy chooses to spend the rest of his life following the feral people. As Snowy arrives to the coast of Sussex, he reflects on how everything humans ever made has vanished.

Remembrance (30 My in the future, Western Africa). A monkey-like post-human female. The descendants of feral children have diversified into many non-sapient species, from everything resembling arboreal primates (Remembrance's kind), eusocial mole people, and elephant-like beasts, the latter being "farmed" by theropod-like rodents. They inhabit a lush forest, still having some artificial remains like bits of glass, bitumen and copper. Avoiding rodent and avian predators, Remembrance falls into a mole-folk pit, where she survives for several days. She eventually returns to the canopy, but soon the impact of Eros unleashes a mass extinction.

Ultimate (500 My in the future, Montana). A capuchin-like post-human female inhabiting the deserts of Pangaea Ultima. Her species is closely symbiotic with borametz trees, which grow pods to sleep and nurse their young. Due to the harsh climate, the tree begins consuming Ultimate's child, and she takes her to the desert, accompanied with her friend, Cactus. They encounter descendants of beetles, rats, lizards and toads, and Cactus is hunted by a huge, transparent salamander. A few days later, Ultimate arrives to the shores of a drying inland sea, where she finds the hardened footprints of one of her kind, both of them being the last "human" explorers. After returning and giving her child to the tree, Ultimate becomes the last primate to reproduce, and soon her herd and tree die. In the following eons Earth is consumed by the Sun, but hibernating bacteria are hurled into space and end up on the seas of a habitable exoplanet, starting evolution again.

=== Protagonists outside the Purga–human line ===
Characters listed below are not ancestral to or descend from humans, although some are primates and thus descend from Purga.

Listener (145 Mya, Pangaea). A female Ornitholestes living with Stego, her mate. Unlike most animals in the book, they are fully sapient, with complex language, leather belts, whips, and a culture that revolves around Diplodocus hunting. Stego is killed by an Allosaurus during a hunt, and Listener swears to kill the Diplodocus matriarch that indirectly caused his death. Ten years later, she and her three sons manage to hunt the matriarch, which dooms the herd as well as the Ornitholestes settlement. They become extinct and humans never discover that another sapient species preceded them.

Roamer (32 Mya, North Africa). A female of a capuchin-like primate species unknown to paleontology. After a flood destroys her home, she finds herself and other members of her species on a haphazard raft on the Atlantic. Starvation and thirst nearly kill them, but Roamer and two other survivors eventually land on the rainforests of Yucatán and their descendants give rise to a new line of monkeys.

Dig (10 Mya, Antarctica). A female of a lemming-like primate species. The Antarctica she inhabits still has forests inhabited by the descendants of Velociraptor, Allosaurus and Muttaburrasaurus. Though more temperate than today, the Antarctic forests are becoming progressively colder and more inhospitable. Ice caps completely bury the remains of Dig's ecosystem and humans never discover that non-avian dinosaurs survived 55 million years longer than previously thought.

Johnnie (21st century, Mars). Humanity's first self-replicating robot, which lands on Mars during Joan's conference. Although its original purpose is to construct bases for human habitation, it stops receiving orders due to the chaos unleashed by Rabaul's eruption on Earth and continues replicating itself unhindered. Within a few centuries, Johnnie's descendants have consumed the planet entirely and leave the Solar System. As the self-replication process is imperfect, they begin undergoing a process akin to biological evolution. About 500 million years later, a self-aware probe arrives on Earth to investigate the origins of its kind. Although it encounters evidence of past intelligent activity, and even Ultimate —its creators' descendant— it considers its mission a failure and leaves.

== Reception ==
Peter Cannon reviewing for Publishers Weekly stated "here is a rigorously constructed hard SF novel where the question is not whether humanity will reach the stars but how it will survive its own worst tendencies." Kirkus Reviews called this novel "glum, dyspeptic, and depressing." Jackie Cassada said in her review for Library Journal that "spanning more than 165 million years and encompassing the entire planet, Baxter's ambitious saga provides both an exercise in painless paleontology and superb storytelling."

Evolution has been compared to Olaf Stapledon's Last and First Men. Baxter has acknowledged Stapledon's influence.
