= Marie-Anne de Roumier-Robert =

French writer

- Born: 1705
- Died: 12 January 1771 (aged 65–66); Paris, France
- Occupation: Writer
- Known for: Voyage de Milord Céton dans les sept planètes

Marie-Anne de Roumier-Robert (1705 – 12 January 1771) was a French writer. She wrote one of the earliest known works of science fiction, Voyage de Milord Céton dans les sept planètes ("Lord Seton's Voyage Among the Seven Planets", 1765).

== Biography ==
Marie-Anne Roumier was from a family related to Bernard Le Bovier de Fontenelle and received a good education. Her talent for writing had been noticed by Fontenelle. Ruined by Law's bankruptcy Law's, she retired to a convent before marrying Jean Paul Robert, a lawyer in Parliament, in 1737.

She was representative of the rise of women's writing in the 1760s. In her novels, she featured women using philosophical discourses. In Les Ondins, a moral tale and Amazon utopia published in 1768, she defended the idea of a woman being able to choose the man she was to marry. Her novel Nicole de Beauveais went further, suggesting the possibility of an autonomous life for women outside marriage. Voyage de Milord Céton dans les sept planètes published in 1765 is also considered to be one of the first known feminist science fiction novels.

Her work presents a permanent tension on the question of being able to be both a woman and a philosopher of the Enlightenment, while the Enlightenment excluded women from reason.

== Publications ==
- de Roumier Robert, Marie Anne (1761), La Paysanne philosophe ou Les aventures de madame la comtesse de ***, [S.l.s.n.], 1761–1762, National Library of the Czechoslovak Republic: Chez les Libraires Associés
- de Roumier Robert, Marie Anne (176), La Voix de la nature ou Les aventures de madame la marquise de ***, National Library of the Netherlands, Amsterdam: Aux depens de la compagnie
- de Roumier Robert, Marie Anne (1768), Les Ondins : conte moral, Paris: Nicolas-Augustin Delalain
- de Roumier Robert, Marie Anne (1768), Nicole de Beauvais, ou, L'amour vaincu par la reconnoissance, a Haye; Paris: Desaint, Veuve Duchesne, Panckoucke, Delalain
- de Roumier Robert, Marie Anne (1765–1766), Les Voyages de Milord Céton dans les sept Planettes, Paris, La Haye

== Bibliography ==
- Harth, Erica (2018-08-06). Cartesian Women: Versions and Subversions of Rational Discourse in the Old Regime. Cornell University Press. ISBN 978-1-5017-2174-8..
- Voisset-Veysseyre, Cécile (2010). Des amazones et des femmes. Collection l'Ouverture philosophique. Paris: Harmattan. ISBN 978-2-296-10832-5. OCLC 503247856..
- Genieys, Séverine (2003), "Marie-Anne de Roumier Robert lectrice des romancières du dix-septième siècle", in Brouard-Arends, Isabelle (ed.), Lectrices d'Ancien Régime, Interférences (in French), Rennes: Presses universitaires de Rennes, pp. 341–349, ISBN 978-2-7535-4608-0
