= Delta-v (disambiguation) =

Delta-v is a term that is used in astrodynamics for the total 'effort' to change from one space trajectory to another.

Delta V may also refer to:

== Science and technology ==
- Delta-V (Internet Protocol), a Web Versioning and Configuration Management Protocol specified by RFC 3253 for WebDAV
- Delta-v (physics), a mathematical symbol representing a change in velocity as a scalar or vector quantity
- Delta-v budget (velocity change budget), a term used in astrodynamics for velocity change requirements of propulsive tasks and orbital manoeuvres during a space mission
- Delta-V charging method, a charging method for Nickel–metal hydride batteries
- DeltaV, a distributed control system by Emerson Electric used in industrial process control

== Other uses ==
- Delta-v, a novel by Daniel Suarez
- Delta-V (musical group), an Italian band signed by Virgin Records
- Delta V (video game), a flying game published by Bethesda Softworks
- ΔV: Rings of Saturn, 2023 video game
- "Delta-V", a song by Squarepusher from Just a Souvenir
- "Delta-V", an episode from season 3 of The Expanse

== See also ==
- Delta 5, a UK punk band
