= Close to Critical =

1958 novel by Hal Clement

- First book edition
- Author: Hal Clement
- Cover artist: Paul Lehr
- Language: English
- Series: Mesklin
- Genre: Science fiction
- Publisher: Ballantine Books
- Publication date: July 1964
- Publication place: United States
- Media type: Print (magazine, hardback and paperback)
- Pages: 190 (paperback)
- Preceded by: Mission of Gravity
- Followed by: Star Light

Close to Critical is a science fiction novel by American writer Hal Clement. The novel was first serialized in three parts and published in Astounding Science Fiction magazine in 1958. Its first hardcover book publication was in July 1964.

== Setting ==
Revolving on an orbit about the star Altair, Tenebra is an example of one of Hal Clement's "hellworlds". 27 times the mass of Earth, Tenebra is three times Earth's diameter (38,226 kilometers; 23,753 miles) and has three times Earth's gravity at its surface (29.43 meters per second per second; 96.6 feet per second per second), which gives Tenebra an escape velocity of 33.558 kilometers per second (nearly 21 miles per second). Clement also describes the planet as rotating on its axis in a little less than four Earth days.

Tenebra has an atmosphere "consisting of water heavily laced with oxygen and oxides of sulphur". At the surface the temperature comes close enough to the critical point of water (temperature = 374 Celsius; 705 Fahrenheit : pressure = 22.1 megaPascals; 217.755 atmospheres) that during the night the atmosphere begins to condense into the liquid state and falls as raindrops 9 to 15 meters (30 to 49 ft) wide. The naively expected density of the surface atmosphere stands at about 322 kilograms per cubic meter (compared to 1.2 kilograms per cubic meter at sea level on Earth). But the raindrops descend slowly, even in Tenebra's stiff gravity.

That latter statement necessitates, as Clement states in the story, that the surface pressure on Tenebra be 800 atmospheres, not 218. At 800 atmospheres of pressure the surface atmosphere, with its load of dissolved oxygen and sulphur oxides, is compressed to a density a little less than the density of liquid water (1182 kilograms per cubic meter). Only when the density of the planet's air is a little less than the density of liquid water will the raindrops descend slowly; otherwise, they would come down like meteors and make life on Tenebra impossible.

But life is possible on Tenebra. Although Clement doesn't say so explicitly, Tenebra's plants do not use photosynthesis. The optical depth of the atmosphere is too great for enough of Altair's light to reach the ground. Instead, Tenebra's plants use chemosynthesis based on the transformation of sulphur oxides. The process is much like that used by autotrophs living in and around hydrothermal vents known as black smokers at the bottom of Earth's oceans. Altair's abundant ultraviolet radiation, striking the top of Tenebra's atmosphere, restores the balance among the various sulphur oxides.

Because Tenebra's atmosphere contains large quantities of sulphur, the planet's lakes and small oceans are filled with sulphuric acid. Throughout the day-night cycle the lakes and oceans rise and fall like tides in the Bay of Fundy, due to the heavy nightly rainfall and the easy evaporation of the liquid water (its heat of vaporization stands close to zero under Tenebran conditions). The constant ebb and flow of hot, pressurized sulphuric acid weakens the planet's crust, resulting in frequent earthquakes and minor rearrangements of the landscape.

For two decades humans have been observing this world from the space station Vindemiatrix, which revolves about Tenebra on a synchronous orbit, one with a period just under 96 hours.

== Plot summary ==
It began with human researchers sending a semi-autonomous robot to the surface of Tenebra. The robot descended on rocket boosters until atmospheric pressure exceeded the pressure in the rockets' combustion chambers. Instead of generating thrust, the rockets began to overheat and melt themselves, so the controllers jettisoned the engines and the robot completed its descent under a parachute.

After acclimatizing itself to the dark world under Tenebra's thick clouds, the robot set out to explore. After months of mapping the territory and observing the plants and animals, the robot encountered a sentient native. The creature resembled a very large, scale-armored fir cone with four pairs of limbs; the lowest pair used for walking, the next pair apparently not used at all, and the upper two pairs used for prehension (used as arms and hands). A set of spines jutting from the top of the creature served as lensless eyes, making maximum use of the thin flow of photons seeping from the sky.

Unseen by the native, the robot followed it, stole ten of its eggs and a good selection of the stone knives that the creature had set out in booby traps, and then took its loot far from the caves in which the creature and its clan lived.

Sixteen years later Nick Chopper is on the run. Trying to elude the people he is certain are tracking him, he returns to the little hilltop village of huts that he shares with his nine siblings and the robot, now called Fagin (a reference to the character in Charles Dickens' novel Oliver Twist). He reports that while he was mapping some new territory he had encountered, for the first time, creatures just like himself. He had stayed with them long enough to learn a little of their language. Through a diplomatic error Nick gains the enmity of the chief of the people, a nine-foot brute whose name translates into English as Swift. Fearing that Swift intends to bring his warriors to their village to murder him and his siblings, Nick dares, for the first time, to travel at night, using burning sticks (fire on Tenebra does not produce flames, but merely glows the bright yellow-orange of fresh embers) both to light his way and to fend off the raindrops that would knock him out if one enveloped him.

Before Nick, on Fagin's instructions, can go back down the trail to intercept Swift and make peace, Swift and his warriors arrive and attack the village. Using fire as a weapon, Nick and his siblings manage to fight Swift and his warriors to a stalemate. To avoid further violence, Fagin goes with Swift back to his cave village and Nick and his siblings prepare to abandon their village to find a safer place to stay.

Meanwhile, aboard the space station Vindemiatrix, Dr Helven Raeder, the current voice of Fagin, is interrupted by Amindebarlee, the ambassador from Dromm, a planet of Eta Cassiopeiae (19.42 lightyears from Sol, 21.92 lightyears from Altair), and his son Aminadorneldo. The presence of the Drommians, who resemble hairless ten-foot otters with five pairs of limbs and who have voices pitched much higher than human voices, reminds Raeder of something he can use to solve his problem with Fagin.

The humans have built a space-going bathyscaphe that they intend to use to descend to Tenebra's surface and then return to Vindemiatrix. Raeder conceives the idea of using the craft to rescue Fagin by using the bathyscaphe's grapplers to pick up the robot and then fly it away so that Swift and his people cannot track it. Then he will move Nick and his siblings far away to avoid the inevitable retaliation. Unfortunately for Raeder's plan Aminadorneldo and Easy Rich, the twelve-year-old daughter of Councilor Rich, have gone to tour the bathyscaphe. While the two are alone aboard the craft, the bathyscaphe suffers an accident that sends it onto a trajectory that will compel it to land on Tenebra. Worse, although Aminadorneldo looks like an adult Drommian, he is actually four years old, with the development level of a seven-year-old Terran boy.

The bathyscaphe lands safely on Tenebra, but the rescue team discovers that the electrolyzers do not work. Meant to use Tenebra's atmosphere as feedstock, they were intended to fill the bathyscaphe's flotation cells with hydrogen so that the craft would rise high enough into the atmosphere for its rocket engines to work and, in this case, to be intercepted by a shuttle that would stand on the thrust of its engines while an engineer finished connecting the circuits that would fire the bathyscaphe's rockets. In some desperation Raeder decides to ask Nick and his siblings to find the bathyscaphe and then, following his instructions, repair the electrolyzers.

Having piled as many of their belongings as they can on the little cart that they have used in gathering firewood, Nick and the others round up their livestock (which they call by the English word cattle), and set out on Tenebra's first ever cattle drive, heading for the coast. Once they have found a relatively safe place and set up camp, Nick goes back to the cave village to rescue Fagin while the others set out to map the area around their camp. Using fire to distract Swift's people, Nick takes off with Fagin and rejoins his siblings. Swift and his people are not far behind, but before a battle can erupt Fagin convinces the two groups to work together in finding the bathyscaphe.

Once the Tenebrites have found the bathyscaphe they must somehow send it high into the atmosphere. Rather than attempt to repair the electrolyzers, they use an alternative plan devised by Easy. They capture floaters, jellyfish-like creatures with stinging tentacles and hydrogen-filled flotation sacs. After hacking off the creatures' tentacles, they bring them to the bathyscaphe and squeeze their hydrogen directly into the bathyscaphe's buoyancy tanks. There's no shortage of floaters: a strange wind that has been blowing for many days keeps bringing more to the area. When the Tenebrites have put just enough hydrogen into the bathyscaphe's tanks the craft lifts off the ground and, in the other part of Easy's plan, the wind carries the craft to its source, the caldera of a wide and active volcano, whose hot updraft carries the bathyscaphe to its rendezvous with the shuttle.

== Reception ==
SF Impulse reviewer Tom Boardman Jr. commended the novel for its "impressive plotting and sustained suspense," noting that Clement's "consummate craftsmanship" turned a simple story into an intense one.

James Nicoll, writing in 2017, noted that "(m)odern readers may be appalled by the casual way that Fagin steals eggs and raises a clutch of helpless infants to serve as his spies", and lauded Clement's choice to show that raising Tenebrans as humans, in total isolation from Tenebran culture, would have long-term negative repercussions; he also praised the egalitarian and nonsexualized portrayal of Easy Rich.
