= Sewell Moody =

Sewell Prescott Moody
- Born: c. 1834
- Died: November 4, 1875 (aged 40–41)

Sewell Prescott "Sue" Moody (c. 1834 – November 4, 1875) (Note: Sources differ over his year of birth, variously given as 1834, 1837, c.1837, and "probably between 1835 and 1840",) was a lumberman and Yankee trader from Hartland, Maine, United States, the son of Joshua Moody and Amy Kendall Bowley. With his brother Thomas, Moody arrived in New Westminster, British Columbia, Canada in about 1861, initially engaging in mining investment and trading. In 1862 he established a business to build British Columbia's first sizeable steam-powered sawmill, at New Westminster.

Moody moved to the Burrard Inlet in 1865, eventually acquiring a bankrupt water-powered sawmill, and established the first non-native settlement in the area, in what is now North Vancouver. Initially known as "Moody's Mills", in 1872 it was formally named Moodyville. Under a firm but paternalistic hand, he provided the settlement with a library and reading room, religious services, a masonic lodge and a school, each being the first on Burrard Inlet, and also funded the extension of the telegraph service from New Westminster. At the same time, he forbade gambling and the sale of alcohol. In July 1869, Moody married Janet Watson (1849–1901) and they had two children, Florence and Sewell Prescott Jr. Moody's lumber business was successful, supplying markets in Great Britain and around the Pacific Rim, and adding a larger steam-powered mill in 1868. This mill was burned in December 1873, but replaced with another, powered by the steam engines from retired warship HMS Sparrowhawk.

Moody died on November 4, 1875, in the sinking of the passenger steamer SS Pacific following a collision off Cape Flattery, Washington.
