= Mesklin =

Fictional planet

Reproduction of diagrams by Hal Clement, originally published in his article "Whirligig World", Astounding Science Fiction, June 1953. Top: Diagram of the cross-sectional shape of Mesklin, with approximate values for the effective surface gravity at various latitudes (in multiples of Earth gravity). The dashed lines are polar circles. The shaded circle in the middle represents the size of Earth on the same scale. Bottom: Diagram of Mesklin's orbit, with approximate isotherms and times of crossing them.

Mesklin is a fictional planet created by Hal Clement and used in a number of his hard science fiction stories, starting with Mission of Gravity (1954). Alongside the novel's original 1953 serialization in Astounding Science Fiction, Clement published an essay titled "Whirligig World" on how he designed the planet to have the properties he wanted. The idea came from an object that was at the time believed to exist in the 61 Cygni system, and which might represent an extrasolar planet.

The planet is distinctive for the interaction of its strong gravity with the centrifugal force due to its fast rotation, giving it a gradient in the perceived force of gravity from 3 g on the equator to 665 g on the planet's poles. It is inhabited by native lifeforms, including an intelligent centipede-like species, the Mesklinites.

Mesklin is considered a prototypical example of hard science fiction worldbuilding, an exotic milieu that nevertheless accords with known facts and laws of physics. While the planet itself is vastly dissimilar to Earth, its inhabitants are commonly regarded as noticeably humanlike in behavior, if not in appearance. Mesklin itself is sometimes viewed as the main character of Mission of Gravity.

== Description ==
Mesklin is a fictional planet orbiting one of the stars in 61 Cygni, a binary star system. Its mass is sixteen times that of Jupiter, or 4,800 times Earth mass. It has a very high rate of rotation, with one day on the planet lasting only eighteen minutes. As a result, the planet is significantly flattened with a large equatorial bulge: the diameter at the equator is 77,000 km while the diameter between the poles is slightly below 32,000 km. By comparison, the diameter of Earth is approximately 13,000 km. The planet thus has a significantly higher mass than Jupiter within a much smaller volume, and its planetary core is made up of collapsed matter. The surface gravity is very high at 665 times Earth gravity at the poles, but at the equator the effective gravity is only three times Earth's as the rapid rotation generates a significant centrifugal force that counteracts most of the gravitational force.

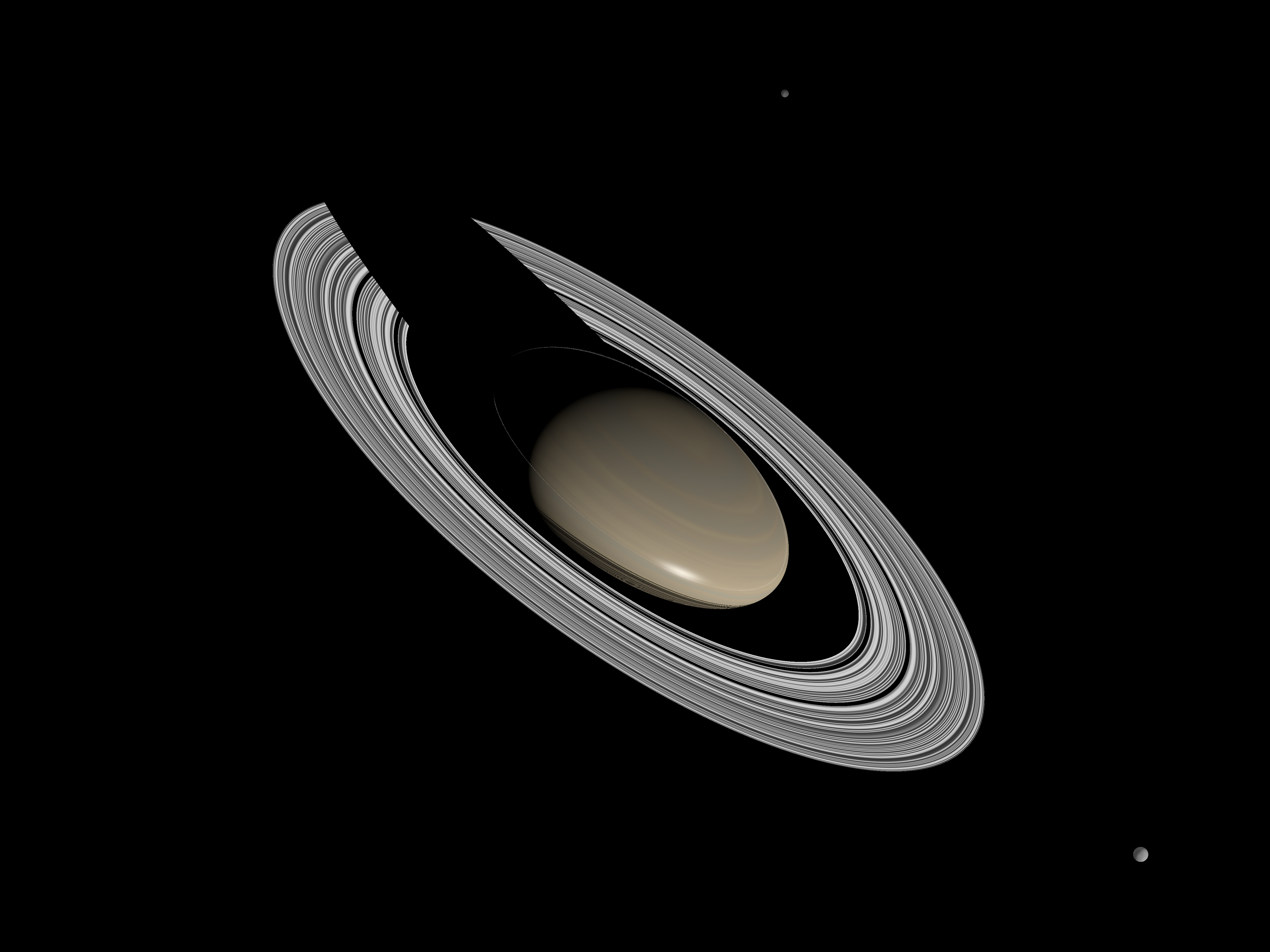
Artist's rendering of Mesklin

Mesklin orbits its star in an elongated ellipse, completing a full revolution in 1,800 Earth-days. The high orbital eccentricity combines with a pronounced axial tilt to result in an uneven seasonal cycle. In the southern hemisphere, the springs and summers are very lengthy (28 Earth-months each), and the autumns and winters are much briefer (2 months each); the pattern is reversed in the northern hemisphere. The two hemispheres thus have significantly different climates. The planet is cold, with average temperatures ranging from −50 °C at the closest approach to its star to −180 °C at the furthest point in its orbit. Mesklin is itself orbited by two small moons and has a large ring system.

The surface is covered mostly by methane (CH_{4}) and ammonia (NH_{3}), both mainly in the liquid state; the oceans are primarily made up of methane, while the ammonia is also present as snow. The atmosphere is principally composed of hydrogen, and its density decreases with increasing altitude to such a degree that atmospheric refraction through the successive layers produces the optical illusion that an observer on the surface perceives the ground as curving upwards, as if living on the concave inside of a bowl rather than the convex surface of a spheroid.

The planet is inhabited by various lifeforms. The intelligent native inhabitants, the Mesklinites, resemble centipedes or caterpillars. They are 40 cm long and 5 cm wide, with eighteen pairs of legs ending in suckers, as well as a forward pair of pincers for manipulation and a rear pair for attaching to the ground. They have four eyes and mandibles. They have a tough exoskeleton that allows them to withstand the planet's strong gravity. They have no lungs but breathe hydrogen by absorbing it directly from the atmosphere in a manner similar to that used by the respiratory system of insects, whereas oxygen is toxic to them. They are able to survive while submerged for extended periods of time by breathing dissolved gases. Their lifespan is much longer than that of humans. They have a strong fear of heights and of being underneath objects, owing to the danger posed by such things in a high-gravity environment. For similar reasons, they have no concept of flying or throwing things. Their society is pre-industrial, with rudimentary technology including seafaring vessels.

== Appearances ==
The planet first appeared in Hal Clement's novel Mission of Gravity (1954), which was first serialized in Astounding Science Fiction (April–July 1953). The third of the four serial instalments, in the June 1953 issue, was accompanied by a 13-page article by Clement titled "Whirligig World" describing the planet and the process of creating it in detail. Clement later wrote an additional three fictional works using the planet or its denizens: the sequel novel Star Light (1971; originally serialized in Analog Science Fiction/Science Fact, June–September 1970) and the short stories "Lecture Demonstration" (1973) and "Under" (2000). (Note: The novel Close to Critical (1964; originally serialized in Astounding Science-Fiction, May–July 1958) is also set in the same continuity, sharing some characters with Star Light.) The book Heavy Planet (2002) is a collection of these five Mesklin-related works. In "Whirligig World", Clement encouraged other authors to use Mesklin as a setting for their stories provided that they stay within "reasonable scientific standards", while acknowledging that to be "certainly an elastic requirement in the field of science fiction".

== Concept and creation ==
Thus it is seen that we have just enough theoretical knowledge to make guesses at the physical state of the new planet without being able to make any definite statements about it or give an emphatic NO to even the wildest proposals. An ideal world for exploration via Science-Fiction!

— Robert S. Richardson, "The World of 61 Cygni C", published in Astounding Science Fiction, July 1943

Clement drew inspiration from astronomical work published in Publications of the Astronomical Society of the Pacific by Kaj Aage Gunnar Strand in 1943. Strand's analysis of the motion of the two known stars in the 61 Cygni system suggested the presence of a third, unseen object of relatively small size and mass. This was the first evidence—albeit indirect—of what might be an extrasolar planet; the discovery has since come to be regarded as likely erroneous. (Note: See 61 Cygni § Claims of a planetary system and Exoplanet § Discredited claims for further details.) Clement used what was thought to be known about the object, dubbed 61 Cygni C by astronomers, and tried to create an interesting setting for a story within those bounds. The magazine Astounding Science Fiction had published a nonfiction article on the apparent discovery in the July 1943 issue—"The World of 61 Cygni C" by Robert S. Richardson, who also published fiction under the pseudonym Philip Latham—and Clement may have used Richardson's work in addition to Strand's.

The calculated mass of the object, at approximately 16 Jupiter masses, meant it was expected to be somewhat smaller than Uranus as a result of gravitational compression. At the time, it was unclear whether the object would behave more like a very low-mass and faint star (a brown dwarf) or a high-mass planet (Super-Jupiter); Clement elected to depict Mesklin as the latter in order to be able to use it as a setting for his story. Given this size and mass, the surface gravity would be about 300 times Earth gravity (300 g). Clement decided to reduce the effective gravity by providing the planet with a rapid rate of rotation to make it possible for humans to land on it in the story. He settled on an effective equatorial gravity of 3 g and worked backwards from there to calculate the spin that would result in the centrifugal force necessary to offset the correct amount of the planet's gravitational pull. A high rate of rotation was deemed plausible given what was known about planet formation and the fact that the more massive planets in the Solar System spin more rapidly than the less massive ones such as Earth. The rapid spin also meant that Mesklin would be significantly flattened by the centrifugal force, which over time would redistribute its matter away from the poles and towards the equator.

The combined effect of the difference between the polar radius and the equatorial one, which makes the gravity stronger at the poles since the force of gravity decreases with distance, and the centrifugal force decreasing from its maximum at the equator to zero at the poles would result in a great difference between the gravitational pulls experienced at the two locations. This was one of Clement's goals: he wanted to challenge the assumption—present in planetary science and science fiction alike—that while different planets might have stronger or weaker gravity, the gravitational field of a single planet would not display a large degree of variation across its surface. Clement calculated the gravity at the poles to be 665 g, but noted a low degree of confidence in this figure as the standard methods used for calculating the gravity of a spherical object would not be applicable to such a distorted shape, and stated that formulae different from the ones he used suggested that his figure might be too high by a factor of two. Clement redid his calculations years later with the aid of a computer rather than the slide rule he had originally used, coming up with a figure around 275 g for the polar gravity.

Based on the inferred orbit of 61 Cygni C and the known properties of the stars in the system, Clement calculated that the planet would be very cold at an average temperature of −170 °C throughout the majority of its year, with a low of −180 °C and a high of −50 °C. Clement wanted his imagined planet to have native lifeforms, and reasoned that this would necessitate a substance that is liquid under these temperature conditions to play the role in the living tissue that water plays in life as we know it. He enlisted the help of biochemistry teacher and fellow science fiction writer Isaac Asimov, and together they worked through various alternatives such as carbon disulfide (CS_{2}) and hydrogen fluoride (HF) before settling on methane, and developed a basic outline for the kind of ecosystem and lifeforms that could plausibly exist in such a chemical environment. The low boiling point of methane (−164 °C at Earth's atmospheric pressure, and −143 °C at an atmospheric pressure eight times greater, calculated by Clement to be the maximum possible on Mesklin) meant that the oceans would be expected to boil during the warmest 300 (Earth-)days of the planet's 1,800-day year. To solve this problem, Clement provided the planet with an axial tilt of 28° such that the northern hemisphere's summer solstice would coincide with the closest approach to its star, reasoning that the northern hemisphere would then amass a substantial polar ice cap during its lengthy winter that would be melted and boiled off in the summer, while the southern hemisphere would be shielded from the heat by being pointed away from the star and remain livable as the planet reached the nearest point in its orbit.

== Analysis ==
=== Hard science fiction ===
In short, to avoid a much longer list, it is safe to say that nearly everything about the planet Mesklin is not only scientifically valid, but also carefully extrapolated from known data and theory. Mesklin was constructed by Clement through a process something like this: If A is postulated, then current scientific knowledge and theory states that B, C, D, and so on either must follow or can logically and validly follow.

— L. David Allen, 1973

Science fiction scholar Gary Westfahl, in a 1993 study of the history of hard science fiction, noted "Whirligig World" as both "the first article about a piece of writing firmly identified" as belonging to the subgenre and the first outline of the process of hard science fiction worldbuilding by collecting as much scientific data as possible and extrapolating from it, noting that while Clement rejected the notion of the article being a how-to guide, such texts were later written both by Clement and others such as Poul Anderson. In Science Fiction Literature through History: An Encyclopedia (2021), Westfahl further commented that Mission of Gravity and "Whirligig World" together "effectively launched" the hard science fiction subgenre a few years before the term was coined in 1957. Basil Davenport, writing in 1955, commented that the only aspect not in line with current scientific knowledge was that humans had sent a spaceship to the planet; L. David Allen, writing in 1973, similarly called this level of human spaceflight "one of the few imaginary science details". Clement himself, in "Whirligig World", described his approach to writing (hard) science fiction as a game between the author and the reader, wherein the latter attempts to spot scientific errors and the former attempts to avoid making them; Westfahl commented that this was probably the first description of this "game", and that it has since come to be intimately associated with hard science fiction. In a 1980 interview with Donald M. Hassler, Clement recalled science fiction fans at MIT (Note: Hassler identified the group as the New England Science Fiction Association (NESFA), but Clement himself identified it as the MIT Science Fiction Society (MITSFS) in "Addendum to Whirligig World".) using university computers to calculate the shape of Mesklin, determining that it would actually have a sharp edge at the equator; Clement described having mixed feelings about this, being dismayed at having been caught making an error but heartened that his writing had inspired readers to go to such lengths.

=== Setting ===
Mission of Gravity is noteworthy [...] as the first SF novel built on actual observational data involving another possible solar system

— Gary Westfahl, 1993

Clement's stories about Mesklin were the first to be set on a planet outside the Solar System believed (then) to actually exist. Stephen L. Gillett, writing in The Greenwood Encyclopedia of Science Fiction and Fantasy (2005), described Mesklin as the prototypical example of an alien world vastly dissimilar to Earth. John J. Pierce, writing in 1987, commented that it far surpassed the exotic settings imagined in works like Stanley G. Weinbaum's "Parasite Planet" (1935) and E. E. Smith's Lensman series in terms of its alienness. In Mission of Gravity, the peculiar properties of the planet Mesklin—its high gravity, short day, unusual chemical environment, and so on—are revealed indirectly rather than being explained outright; Neil Barron and Paul A. Carter viewed this as one of the novel's strengths, while Westfahl instead considered it a shortcoming. Westfahl noted that while Clement's "Whirligig World" outlines the creation of the fictional location in detail, it does not discuss the decision to set a story on the world or the process of creating that story. Clement stated that the story came after the setting and the lifeforms that could plausibly inhabit it had already been invented; Westfahl considered this to be a half-truth, reasoning that the purpose behind the lower and thus human-tolerable gravity at the equator and the presence of a chemical environment conducive to life was evidently to facilitate an encounter between humans and aliens and that this basic story idea must thus have been present from the outset even if the details were worked out later. Kingsley Amis, writing in 1960, commented that Clement and other science fiction writers likely engage in this type of worldbuilding primarily as a creative exercise in its own right, rather than as a means to an end in service of telling interesting stories.

=== Mesklinites ===
The Mesklinites are generally regarded as similar to humans in the way they act, think, and speak—even if their appearance is inhuman—and this is often regarded as a flaw in Clement's creation. Chris Morgan, writing in 1999, described the Mesklinites' value system as resembling that of Victorian-era England, while Barron, writing in 1979, found the main Mesklinite character Barlennan to most of all resemble a Yankee trader. Morgan further commented upon the Mesklinites' human-like thought processes and their desire to gain scientific knowledge while at the same time seeking to avoid giving up their independence. In Morgan's view, these things make the Mesklinites more reminiscent of an "emerging third world country" than a wholly alien species; Barron similarly identified a native–colonist analogy. Barron also commented that the depiction of Mesklinite psychology suggests that understanding of the world is shaped by sensory input related to one's physical environment and compared the Mesklinites' perception of their world as a bowl to the human perception of the Earth as flat. Hassler noted that while the Mesklin stories are narrated from a third-person omniscient perspective, the viewpoint characters are Mesklinites a majority of the time. As a result, the reader's understanding of the Mesklinites comes from the Mesklinites' own perspective, such as their reactions to things like the much longer duration of Earth days than the Mesklin days they are used to. Hassler further compared the depiction of the Mesklinites to the works of Jonathan Swift, both in terms of the size differential as in Gulliver's Travels (1726)—calling them "Lilliputians in a Brobdingnagian world"—and their use as a vehicle for social commentary.

=== The planet itself as a character ===
Westfahl, writing in 1996 in the context of the notion that the Mesklinites are too human-like to be interesting as aliens, investigated the argument that Mesklin itself may be considered the main character of Mission of Gravity, as well as the most interesting one. Westfahl compared the situation to Arthur C. Clarke's A Fall of Moondust (1961), where the imperiled characters that might intuitively be viewed as the main characters are less developed than the ones who come to their aid. In his view, the description of the planet in the first line of the novel—"The wind came across the bay like something living"—suggests that this was indeed Clement's intention. More broadly, said Westfahl, one might consider writers of hard science fiction to be applying character writing skills to objects rather than traditional characters, as opposed to neglecting characterization altogether in their stories. Nevertheless, Westfahl did not find Mesklin to be characterized effectively in the novel, which he attributed to Clement's decision to reveal information about the planet piecemeal in an indirect and roundabout way.

== See also ==
- Extrasolar planets in fiction
- Jinx, a strongly prolate (rugby football shaped) planet in Larry Niven's Known Space setting.
- Maclaurin spheroid – Shape of a spinning body of self-gravitating fluid
- Jacobi ellipsoid – Shape taken by a self-gravitating fluid body rotating at constant velocity
