= Hard science fiction =

Science fiction with concern for scientific accuracy

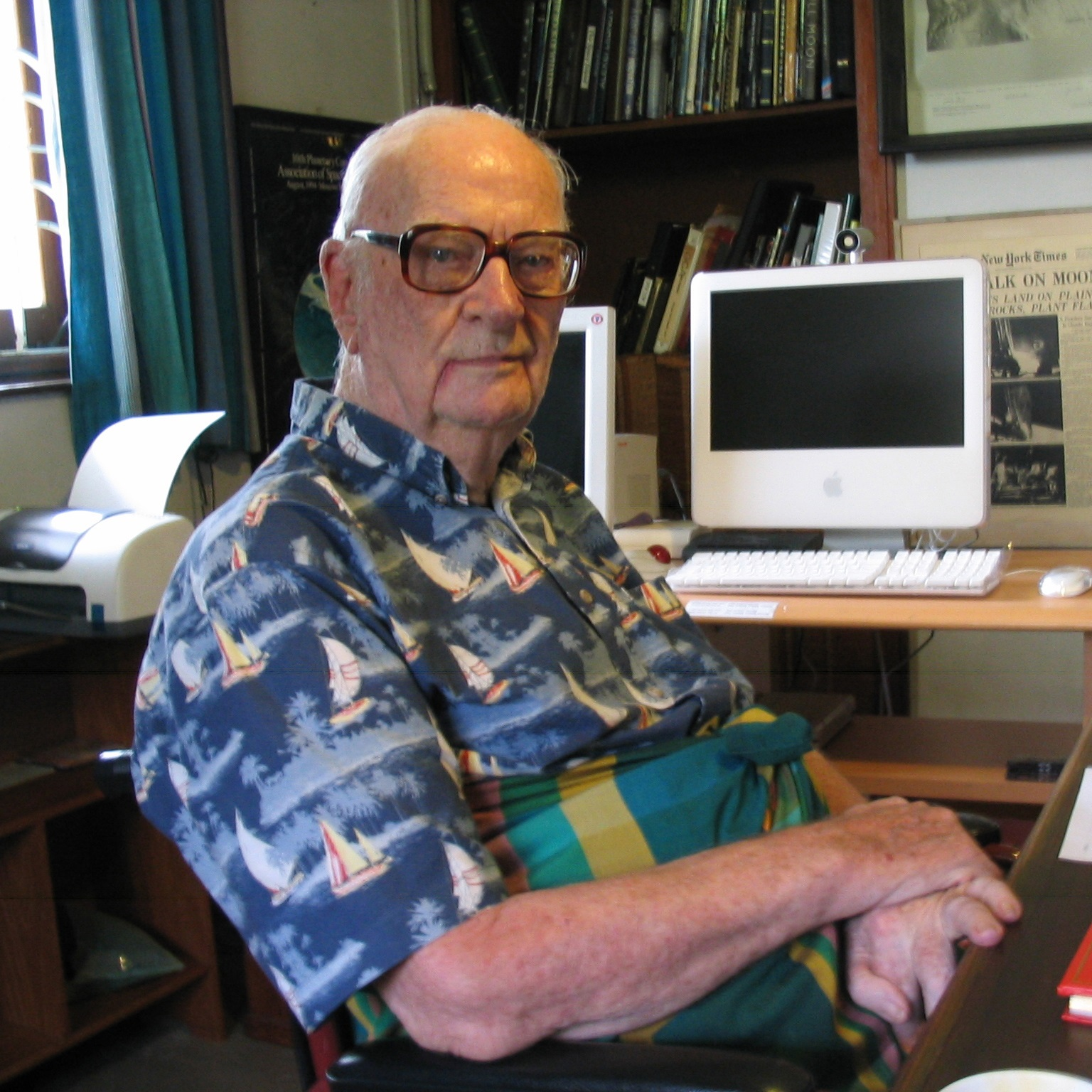
Arthur C. Clarke, one of the most influential writers of hard science fiction

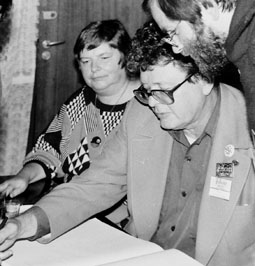
Poul Anderson, author of Tau Zero, Kyrie and others

Hard science fiction is a category of science fiction characterized by high concern for scientific accuracy and logic. The term was first used in print in 1957 by P. Schuyler Miller in a review of John W. Campbell's Islands of Space in the November issue of Astounding Science Fiction. The complementary term soft science fiction, formed by analogy to the popular distinction between the "hard" (natural) and "soft" (social) sciences, first appeared in the late 1970s. Though there are examples generally considered as "hard" science fiction such as Isaac Asimov's Foundation series, built on mathematical sociology, science fiction critic Gary Westfahl argues that while neither term is part of a rigorous taxonomy, they are approximate ways of characterizing stories that reviewers and commentators have found useful.

== History ==
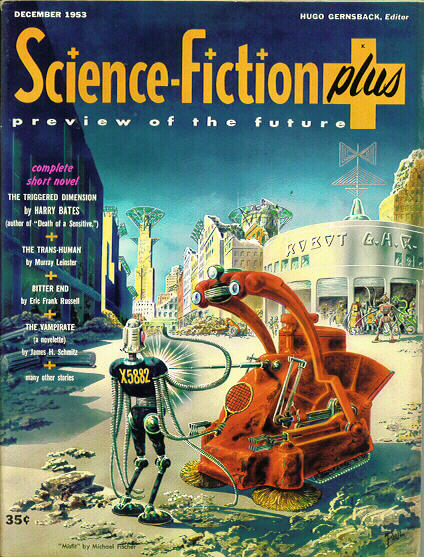
Frank R. Paul's cover for the last issue (December 1953) of Science-Fiction Plus

Stories revolving around scientific and technical consistency were written as early as the 1870s with the publication of Jules Verne's Twenty Thousand Leagues Under the Seas in 1870, among other stories. The attention to detail in Verne's work became an inspiration for many future scientists and explorers, although Verne himself denied writing as a scientist or seriously predicting machines and technology of the future.

Hugo Gernsback believed from the beginning of his involvement with science fiction in the 1920s that the stories should be instructive, although it was not long before he found it necessary to print fantastical and unscientific fiction in Amazing Stories to attract readers. During Gernsback's long absence from science fiction (SF) publishing, from 1936 to 1953, the field evolved away from his focus on facts and education. The Golden Age of Science Fiction is generally considered to have started in the late 1930s and lasted until the mid-1940s, bringing with it "a quantum jump in quality, perhaps the greatest in the history of the genre", according to science fiction historians Peter Nicholls and Mike Ashley.

However, Gernsback's views were unchanged. In his editorial in the first issue of Science-Fiction Plus, he gave his view of the modern SF story: "the fairy tale brand, the weird or fantastic type of what mistakenly masquerades under the name of Science-Fiction today!" and he stated his preference for "truly scientific, prophetic Science-Fiction with the full accent on SCIENCE". In the same editorial, Gernsback called for patent reform to give science fiction authors the right to create patents for ideas without having patent models because many of their ideas predated the technical progress needed to develop specifications for their ideas. The introduction referenced the numerous prescient technologies described throughout Ralph 124C 41+.

== Definition ==
The heart of the "hard science fiction" designation is the relationship of the science content and attitude to the rest of the narrative, and (for some readers, at least) the "hardness" or rigor of the science itself. One requirement for hard SF is procedural or intentional: a story should try to be accurate, logical, credible and rigorous in its use of current scientific and technical knowledge about which technology, phenomena, scenarios and situations that are practically or theoretically possible. For example, the development of concrete proposals for spaceships, space stations, space missions, and a US space program in the 1950s and 1960s influenced a widespread proliferation of "hard" space stories.

Academic Jessica Imbach defines hard science fiction as that which "adheres generally to the known physical laws of the universe and abstains from the use of magic, although this does not necessarily mean that its futuristic scenarios are more 'realistic' than other forms of science fiction and fantasy."

Later discoveries do not necessarily invalidate the label of hard SF, as evidenced by P. Schuyler Miller, who called Arthur C. Clarke's 1961 novel A Fall of Moondust hard SF, and the designation remains valid even though a crucial plot element, the existence of deep pockets of "moondust" in lunar craters, is now known to be incorrect.

There is a degree of flexibility in how far from "real science" a story can stray before it becomes less of a hard SF. Hard science fiction authors only include more controversial devices when the ideas draw from well-known scientific and mathematical principles. In contrast, authors writing softer SF use such devices without a scientific basis (sometimes referred to as "enabling devices", since they allow the story to take place).

Readers of "hard SF" often try to find inaccuracies in stories. For example, a group at MIT concluded that the planet Mesklin in Hal Clement's 1953 novel Mission of Gravity would have had a sharp edge at the equator, and a Florida high school class calculated that in Larry Niven's 1970 novel Ringworld the topsoil would have slid into the seas in a few thousand years. Niven fixed these errors in his sequel The Ringworld Engineers, and noted them in the foreword.

== Representative works ==
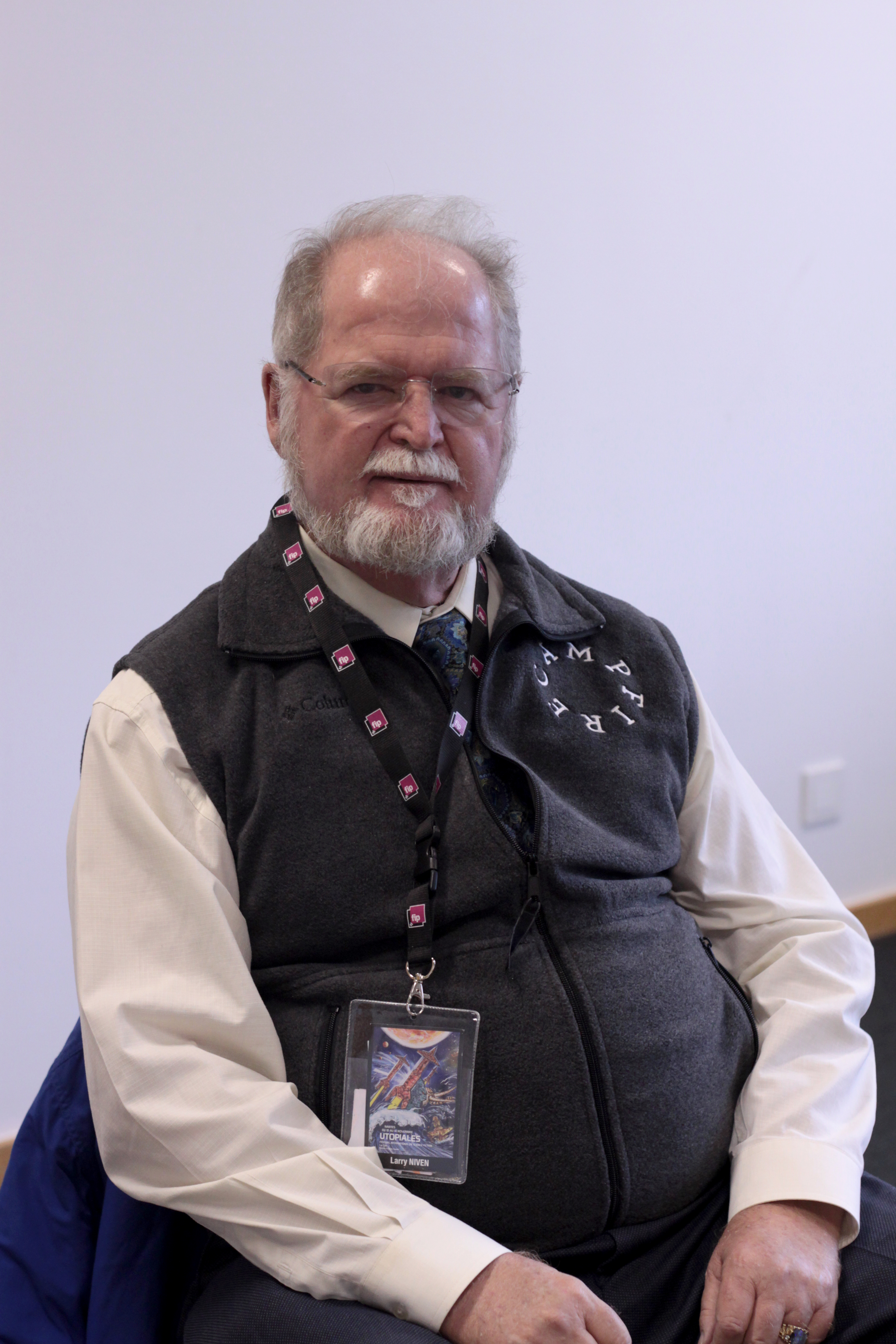
Larry Niven, author of Ringworld, "Inconstant Moon", "The Hole Man" and others

Arranged chronologically by publication year.

=== Anthologies ===
- David G. Hartwell and Kathryn Cramer (eds.), The Ascent of Wonder: The Evolution of Hard SF (1994)
- David G. Hartwell and Kathryn Cramer (eds.), The Hard SF Renaissance: An Anthology (2002)
- Ben Bova and Eric Choi (eds.), Carbide-Tipped Pens: Seventeen Tales of Hard Science Fiction (2014)
- Michael Brotherton (ed.) Science Fiction by Scientists (Springer, 2017)
- Wade Roush (ed.) Twelve Tomorrows (MIT Press 2018)

=== Short stories ===
- Robert Heinlein, The Past Through Tomorrow collection of stories (1939–1962)
- Tom Godwin, "The Cold Equations" (1954)
- Poul Anderson, "Kyrie" (1968)
- Frederik Pohl, "Day Million" (1971)
- Larry Niven, "Inconstant Moon" (1971) and "The Hole Man" (1974)
- Greg Bear, "Tangents" (1986)
- Geoffrey A. Landis, "A Walk in the Sun" (1991)
- Vernor Vinge, "Fast Times at Fairmont High" (2001)

=== Novels ===
- Aldous Huxley, Brave New World (1932)
- Hal Clement, Mission of Gravity (1953)
- Fred Hoyle, The Black Cloud (1957)
- James Blish, A Case of Conscience (1958)
- Jack Vance, The Languages of Pao (1958)
- Arthur C. Clarke, A Fall of Moondust (1961)
- Stanisław Lem, The Invincible (1963)
- John Brunner, Stand on Zanzibar (1968), The Jagged Orbit (1969), The Sheep Look Up (1972), The Shockwave Rider (1975)
- Philip K. Dick, Do Androids Dream of Electric Sheep? (1968)
- Michael Crichton, The Andromeda Strain (1969), Jurassic Park (1990)
- Larry Niven, Ringworld (1970)
- Poul Anderson, Tau Zero (1970)
- James Gunn, The Listeners (1972)
- Larry Niven and Jerry Pournelle, The Mote in God's Eye (1974)
- Bob Shaw, Orbitsville (1975)
- James P. Hogan, The Two Faces of Tomorrow (1979)
- Robert L. Forward, Dragon's Egg (1980) and its sequel Starquake (1985)
- Steven Barnes and Larry Niven, The Descent of Anansi (1982)
- Carl Sagan, Contact (1985)
- Kim Stanley Robinson, The Mars trilogy (Red Mars (1992), Green Mars (1993), Blue Mars (1996), The Ministry for the Future (2020)
- Nancy Kress, Beggars in Spain (1993)
- Charles R. Pellegrino & George Zebrowski, The Killing Star (1995)
- Allen Steele, The Tranquillity Alternative (1996)
- Greg Egan, Schild's Ladder (2002)
- Alastair Reynolds, Pushing Ice (2005)
- Cixin Liu, Remembrance of Earth's Past (trilogy, 2006–2016)
- Andy Weir, The Martian (2011), Project Hail Mary (2021)

=== Films ===
- Destination Moon (1950)
- 2001: A Space Odyssey (1968)
- Colossus: The Forbin Project (1970)
- The Andromeda Strain (1971)
- Silent Running (1972)
- Close Encounters of the Third Kind (1977)
- Blade Runner (1982)
- The Abyss (1989)
- Contact (1997)
- Gattaca (1997)
- Primer (2004)
- Moon (2009)
- Europa Report (2013)
- Her (2013)
- Gravity (2013)
- Ex Machina (2014)
- The Martian (2015)
- Arrival (2016)
- Ad Astra (2019)

=== TV series ===
- The Expanse (2015–2022)
- Away (2020)
- Pantheon (2022–2023)
- 3 Body Problem (2024–present)

=== Anime / manga / comics ===
- Destination Moon (1953)
- Explorers on the Moon (1954)
- Patlabor (1988–present)
- Ghost in the Shell (1989–present)
- Planetes (1999, 2004)
- Rocket Girls (2007)
- Revisions (2018–2019)
- Space Brothers/Uchuu Kyoudai (2007–present, 2012–2014)
- Godzilla Anime Trilogy (2017–2018)

=== Video games ===
- Marathon (1994)
- Policenauts (1994)
- Sid Meier's Alpha Centauri (1999)
- Orbiter (2000)
- SpaceEngine (2010)
- Kerbal Space Program (2015)
- SOMA (2015)
- Hardspace: Shipbreaker (2022)
- The Invincible (2023)
- ΔV: Rings Of Saturn (2023)
- The Alters (2025)
- Terra Invicta (2026)

== See also ==
- Hypothetical technology
- Mundane science fiction
- Techno-thriller
