= Lecture Demonstration =

- Short story by Hal Clement
- Country: United States
- Language: English
- Genre: Science fiction

Publication
- Published in: Astounding: The John W Campbell Memorial Anthology
- Publication type: Anthology
- Media type: Print (Hardcover)
- Publication date: 1973

"Lecture Demonstration" is a science fiction short story by American writer Hal Clement. It was first published in Astounding: The John W Campbell Memorial Anthology in 1973. The story is set on the planet Mesklin introduced in the author's novel Mission of Gravity, but in the equatorial region during an earlier period when the college is still being set up by humans. In the story, a Terrestrial teacher and his Mesklinite students encounter a life-and-death puzzle which they solve using principles of geology and chemistry.

== Plot summary ==
Dr LaVerne, a teacher with the college, takes a party of Mesklinite students on a geological expedition. Whilst examining a layer of rock, it collapses. LaVerne and the students fall into a cavern. They are unable to climb out; the limiting factor is time, as the teacher is enclosed in a suit with a finite oxygen supply.

The students and teacher discuss various possibilities until they realise that they can raise the melting point of the surrounding ammonia 'snow' to the point where it solidifies. They climb out to safety.

== Reception ==
IN 1974, science fiction writer P. Schuyler Miller referred to Hal Clement's short story "Lecture Demonstration" as a "hard-science problem story set on Mesklin".

A 2003 review in Strange Horizons said that "Lecture Demonstration" "begins to resemble a sort of 'minute mystery' conceit that invites the reader to engage in pocket scientific sleuthery at the expense of narrative storytelling".

== Collections ==
"Lecture Demonstration" appears in:

- Astounding: The John W. Campbell Memorial Anthology (1973)
- Mission of Gravity – with Lecture Demonstration (1978)
- The Essential Hal Clement, Volume 3: Variations on a Theme by Sir Isaac Newton (2000)
- Heavy Planet: The Classic Mesklin Stories (2002)
