= C. I. Defontenay =

French writer

Charlemagne Ischir Defontenay, writing as C.I. Defontenay (1819–1856), was a French science fiction writer. His Star, ou Psi Cassiopea of 1854 is seen by some as an example of proto-space opera. Others see Defontenay as a predecessor of Olaf Stapledon. Star describes the discovery in the Himalayas of a stone that has fallen from the sky. After opening it, it turns out to contain a metal box where the narrator finds some paper manuscripts. After two years of study, he managed to decipher them and finds out that they describe the alien societies of various humanoid races living in the constellation of Cassiopeia. One set of creatures were 9-foot tall blue-haired immortal humanoids.

Defontenay's other accomplishments included being a pioneer in plastic surgery. He was a disciple of Fourier and Hoffman. His writings often display his philosophical kinship with those thinkers.

== Œuvres ==
- De la phtisie tuberculeuse envisagée principalement au point de vue de l'hygiène et de la thérapeutique. (1845)
- Essai de calliplastie, études sur les formes du visage et examen de divers moyens propres à les embellir, par le Cid (1846)
- Le trésor de la beauté ou L'art de corriger les difformités du visage, par le Cid (1848) Gallica
- Études dramatiques. I. Barkokébas. II. Le Vieux de la montagne. III. Orphée. IV. Prométhée (1854)
- Star ou Ψ de Cassiopée : histoire merveilleuse de l'un des mondes de l'espace (1854) GoogleLivres

== References and links ==
- C.I. Defontenay at The Encyclopedia of Science Fiction
- Publishers picture and brief information on the book
- Project MUSE, restricted Access
- Science Fiction studies article
- C. I. Defontenay at the Internet Speculative Fiction Database
