= Delta V (video game) =

1994 video game

- Cover art by Dave Menehan
- Developer: Bethesda Softworks
- Publisher: Bethesda Softworks
- Designer: V. J. Lakshman
- Platform: MS-DOS
- Release: 1994
- Genre: Racing
- Mode: Single-player

Delta V (pronounced as Delta Vee) is a first-person science fiction video game for MS-DOS, developed by Bethesda Softworks and released in 1994. It is a spiritual predecessor to XCar: Experimental Racing .

== Gameplay ==
Each mission involved flying a virtual craft along a single predetermined path represented by a trench in virtual space. The trench and the space immediately around it was peppered with obstacles of various shapes and sizes, including helixes and narrow gates. Hitting an obstacle would send the craft back a small distance and take some hitpoints off the armor. Attempting to avoid obstacles by leaving the trench area, or by scraping the bottom of the trench also results in damage.

Various kinds of small enemy fighter and turret drones despatched in swarms by the target system's security would unleash the occasional stream of fire in the attempt to damage the craft's armor. These could be taken down for points. Also, automated security drones in later levels attempt to shoot down the craft, and must have their cannons disabled in order to proceed with the mission. Enemy bosses occasionally make an appearance, and must also be neutralized to proceed with the mission. Certain system targets on the banks of the trench can be hit in order to procure valuable data, energy or shield power by flying into them.

Missions goals include scouting, stealing enemy data and destroying major enemy craft. Mission targets are automatically indicated and locked onto on approach by the Artemis targeting device, and are usually described. Prior to each mission, the player may choose their primary and secondary weapons (other than standard energy-expensive homing torpedoes that come with the craft) from a virtual armory that is added to when research comes up with new weapons (helped along by aforementioned stolen data). Research also comes up with useful devices from time to time, such as one that converts energy to shields, and so on.

Character development is shallow, but the game does feature a few characters that repeat, such as a boss, trainee who the player must mentor, and enemies with grudges. Mission briefing and debriefing often contain important information. The briefing room comes with a feature to view and rotate mission targets and bosses in 3D.

== Plot ==
Delta V, follows a cyberpunk theme, taking place in a future where mega-corporations hire hackers to acquire data, which has become the currency of that era. The player starts the game as a captured hacker who is conscripted by Black Sun, one of the mega-corporations, to join the ranks of their online operatives and risk his life piloting programs through cyberspace to steal rival corporations' data and defend Black Sun against invading hackers. The player's character brain-jacks into cyberspace and operates virtual vehicles and weaponry in a virtual environment to accomplish his mission, while avoiding getting his brain fried by the real effects of virtual damage.

== Development ==
The game was originally scheduled to release in October 1993.

== Reception ==
Reception

Review scores
Publication	Score
Next Generation	2/5
PC Joker	60%
PC Games	71%
PC Player	46%
Power Play	51%
Pelit	60%
PC Gamer	68%

Next Generation reviewed the game, rating it two stars out of five, and stated that "It's just plain hard to move beyond the fact that for all its extras, Delta V is like playing the trench stage of the original Star Wars arcade game over and over again."

James V. Trunzo reviewed Delta V in White Wolf Inphobia #54 (April, 1995), rating it a 3.5 out of 5 and stated that "A final note needs to be sounded on Delta V: you won't find many games like this with better graphics or with more speed. In addition, the game can be played over a modem, allowing you to race against live opponents."

The game was named Best of Show at the Consumer Electronics Show in 1993

The game was the 10th best-selling game for December 1994 (under recreation software) according to The Charlotte Observer.
