= The Hole Man =

1974 science fiction short story by Larry Niven

"The Hole Man" is a science fiction short story by American writer Larry Niven. It was first published in Analog in January 1974. The story won the Hugo Award for Best Short Story in 1975.

== Plot summary ==
In this story, a team of explorers and scientists on Mars encounter an alien base, in which there is a still-functional device, possibly for communication with gravitational wave oscillation. One scientist (who previously made a silly and potentially fatal mistake with his space suit) believes at the center of the device is contained a micro black hole, but his superior does not believe him and ridicules him at every opportunity. Tension mounts as the superior claims to not believe such black holes even exist and gleefully teases the scientist's flustered attempts to explain such things. During a heated argument with his superior, the scientist evidently turns off a containment field, releasing the black hole downward. The hole drops right through the superior, fatally injuring him with tidal forces and an incredibly small 'tunnel' it creates through his entire body as it falls towards the center of the planet. At a group meeting the scientist claims to have done so accidentally, not understanding the alien controls.

Later privately, the scientist defends himself against talk of murdering the man with a most unusual murder weapon; several of the team including the superior had forcefully pronounced that the device could not possibly contain a black hole. Also that any conviction in a trial would require convincing the jury that such a thing could exist, that one was inside the machine, that the scientist understood the controls, that it was foreseeable that the black hole would be released and would harm the man, and intended murder. The story ends with the scientist speculating the possibility whether the black hole will endanger the explorers as it consumes Mars, or whether danger will occur many years later, but possibly still during the lifetime of the scientist.
