= ΔV: Rings of Saturn =

2023 video game

- Developer: Kodera Software
- Publisher: Kodera Software
- Designers: Mariusz Chwalba, Aiden Iozzo, Eric Eshleman
- Programmer: Mariusz Chwalba
- Artists: Mariusz Chwalba, Adam Dudziak, Roksana Dymowska
- Composer: Damian Moloney
- Engine: Godot
- Platforms: Windows, MacOS, Linux
- Release: WW: 21 July 2023 (Note: The game was first made available through early access on 12 August 2019.)
- Genre: Realistic space simulation
- Mode: Single-player

ΔV: Rings of Saturn (Note: ΔV is pronounced "Delta-V", and also occasionally written as such.) is a space flight simulation game developed by Poland-based studio Kodera Software and released on 21 July 2023 after being in early access for several years. Embracing concepts of hard science fiction, the game focuses on asteroid mining, with physics-based mechanics.
