= Day Million =

1970 collection of science fiction short stories by Frederik Pohl

- Cover of the first edition, published by Ballantine Books
- Author: Frederik Pohl
- Language: English
- Genre: Science fiction
- Publisher: Ballantine Books
- Publication date: 1970
- Publication place: United States
- Media type: Print
- Pages: 188 p.
- ISBN: 9780345019394
- OCLC: 1118505248

Day Million is a collection of science fiction short stories by American writer Frederik Pohl, published in June 1970.

== Contents ==
- "Day Million" (1966)
- "The Deadly Mission of Phineas Snodgrass" (1962)
- "The Day the Martians Came" (1967)
- "Schematic Man" (1968)
- "Small Lords" (1956)
- "Making Love" (1966)
- "Way Up Yonder" (1959)
- "Speed Trap" (1967)
- "It's a Young World" (1941)
- "Under Two Moons" (1965)

== Plot summaries ==
The title story, "Day Million", details the romance between two people, referred to as Don and Dora (shortened versions of their full names), who bump into each other for the first time on the millionth day CE, which the author describes as being about a thousand years in the future. The text addresses the reader directly, subverting expectations by revealing that Dora is genetically male but was made female shortly after conception because genetic analysis showed that she would prefer that outcome. Don is described as handsome and bronze, but is revealed to be a partial cyborg who has a metal radiation shield over his entire body to protect him while helping to pilot a starship. Dora for her part likes being semi-aquatic, so she had gills installed. The two get married, exchange personality information, and part forever. They can thus experience virtual sex with each other and with any number of other lovers.

In the "Schematic Man" a man's life is transcribed into a computer to the point where he begins to believe that he is living within the machine.

In "Making Love", population control is effected by providing everybody with simulated lovers indistinguishable from the real thing.

"Under Two Moons" is a parody of the John Carter stories by Edgar Rice Burroughs and the James Bond franchise, with the hero cast as a space-traveling secret agent.

"The Day the Martians Came" is a short piece about men in a bar making up jokes about the newly discovered Martians, who are pathetic primitive beings. All are re-workings of old racial jokes. Somebody suggests that discovering the Martians would not matter to anybody, but the black bartender responds that it might matter a lot to people like him.

"The Deadly Mission of P. Snodgrass" is a time-travel story in which the protagonist gives modern medicine and technology to the Romans. The resultant population explosion, extrapolated to the 20th century, results in the entire mass of the planet Earth consisting of human bodies. It was originally published as a humorous essay on the "Editor's Page" of Galaxy Science Fiction (June 1962).
