= Star Light (novel) =

1970 novel by Hal Clement

- First edition
- Author: Hal Clement
- Cover artist: Dean Ellis
- Language: English
- Series: Mesklin
- Genre: Science fiction
- Publisher: Ballantine Books
- Publication date: June - September 1970 (serial); September 1971 (book)
- Publication place: United States
- Media type: Print (Magazine, Paperback & Hardback)
- Pages: 279 (paperback)
- ISBN: 0-345-02361-7
- OCLC: 4106267
- Preceded by: Mission of Gravity

Star Light is a science fiction novel by American writer Hal Clement. It is the sequel to one of Clement's earlier books, Mission of Gravity. The novel was serialized in four parts in Analog Science Fiction/Science Fact Magazine from June to September 1970. Star Light was first published as a paperback book by Ballantine Books in September 1971.

== Setting ==
Star Light is set several decades after the events of Mission of Gravity. It takes place mostly on the supergiant planet Dhrawn, which some suspect of being a failed star. The planet has an ammonia/water atmosphere with some oxygen, at temperatures ranging from 70 Kelvins to almost the freezing point of water. The planet rotates extremely slowly, taking around two months for one revolution. It also has a long eccentric orbit around its star, which is a red dwarf, Lalande 21185. Much of the planet's heat seems to come from within. The gravity at the surface is 40 times the Earth's. Almost everything about the planet defies scientific theory, including its size, lack of hydrogen, its temperature, and the presence of free oxygen in its atmosphere.

== Plot summary ==
A consortium of spacefaring races, including humans, recruits Mesklinites, the centipede-like natives of the high-gravity planet Mesklin, to explore Dhrawn. The recruits include Barlennan and Dondragmer, respectively the Captain and First Mate of the Bree, a merchant vessel of Mesklin, which in Mission of Gravity sailed to Mesklin's south pole to rescue a probe sent by humans. Now, thanks to institutes of learning set up on Mesklin, the natives have produced capable explorers who can go where other races cannot.

Barlennan is in command of the main base on Dhrawn while Dondragmer commands a "land cruiser", the Kwembly. This is a tracked vehicle about 30 meters long, 6 meters high and the same wide. It is designed to move like a large worm on independently steerable trucks. The power is supplied by self-contained fusion generators but the controls are simple pulley-and-rope systems using Mesklinite materials which the crew can repair by themselves. There are several more cruisers, and each has audio/video links for communication with satellites.

The humans and others are on a satellite in synchronous orbit above the explorers on the ground. Unfortunately, the planet's slow rotation means that they are about 10 million kilometres above the surface, and signals take over 30 seconds to travel to the satellite. Real-time conversations are therefore impossible.

On the satellite are linguist "Easy" Hoffman and her son Benj, who is both an engineer and a linguist. Both speak fluent Stennish, the Mesklinite language, and have formed close personal relationships with the explorers on the surface. They are later joined on the satellite by Ib Hoffman, Easy's husband and Benj's father.

One of the cruisers, the Esket, has apparently suffered a catastrophe and all the crew have vanished, much to Easy's dismay. The cruiser's communicators still function, but all they show are views of a deserted ship.

In reality, Barlennan is executing a complicated deception. A wily negotiator who successfully coerced the humans into setting up a college to teach science to the Mesklinites in Mission of Gravity, he has been secretly arranging for an independent Mesklinite colony to be set up on Dhrawn using the Esket as a base. This has been proceeding successfully for several months.

Soon, however, the Kwembly is in very real trouble. As the planet warms, the complex phase transitions of water and ammonia mixtures at these low temperatures mean that a frozen lake can melt in seconds, carry the ship off in a flood, and equally suddenly leave it hung up on large rocks, unable to move as the liquid around it freezes again, trapping some of the crew below the surface in their protective suits.

A few of the Kwembly's crew are dispatched to report on the condition of the surroundings, but come across one of the crew from the Esket, who is doing likewise in one of the dirigibles that Barlennan is clandestinely using to move his men and matériel around. He momentarily appears on a screen and is recognized by Easy. While the other humans believe that she is mistaken, Ib begins to suspect that something underhanded is going on.

The Hoffmans would prefer to deal honestly with the Mesklinites, but they have to deal with the prejudices, not only of fellow humans with political motives, but with the more paranoid of the non-human supervisors of the mission. Having an inkling of what Barlennan is really after, to have his people learn to fly starships and eventually explore the galaxy in their own right, Ib finally convinces the human administrators that they should treat the bug-like creatures as equals rather than hired hands.

The novel ends with the Mesklinite colonies receiving clandestine help and communication with the Hoffmans, but it is not revealed whether Barlennan's machinations remain secret from the other humans.

== Themes ==
The main theme revolves around hard science, particularly the physics and thermodynamics of mixtures. While water should be in the form of ice at all times on Dhrawn, the effect of ammonia in the atmosphere is to cause it to become a liquid under certain conditions of temperature and pressure, because of the formation of a eutectic mixture which melts and freezes at a much lower temperature than water. Although the scientists on the satellite attempt to supply weather forecasts for the Mesklinites, they are using tools designed for Earth's weather to predict conditions in a two-component water/ammonia system instead of Earth's one-component system. Even local effects, such as liberation of latent heat from mixtures undergoing freezing or condensation, can produce drastic changes in conditions. Seemingly solid surfaces can liquefy under the pressure of the land cruisers, even as individual Mesklinites can walk on them in complete safety.

The novel posits that full disclosure is best in a situation where unpredictable changes can occur. Ib Hoffman relates the story of how his son Benj, at the age of thirteen, designed and built SCUBA equipment, carefully calculating all the parameters, only to come close to dying on his first dive because he lacked a crucial piece of information about the physiology of breathing, one which all his knowledge of physics and engineering could not have predicted.
