= Yankee traders =

American merchants and smugglers from the 19th century

Yankee traders is a term used historically to refer to American merchants and drug smugglers, particularly around the turn of the 19th century. Many of the Yankee traders came from Boston or other New England ports — hence the appellation "Yankee". They were reputed to be particularly shrewd and independent.

== In popular culture ==
In The Last Outpost episode of Star Trek: The Next Generation (1987), the Ferengi (seen on screen for the first time) are compared to Yankee traders by William Riker and Data the android.
