= Mission of Gravity =

1953 novel by Hal Clement

- Cover of first edition (hardcover)
- Author: Hal Clement
- Cover artist: Joseph Mugnaini
- Language: English
- Genre: Hard science fiction
- Publisher: Street & Smith (in serial); Doubleday (in book form)
- Publication date: April–July 1953 (in serial) & 1954 (in book form)
- Publication place: United States
- Media type: Print (Magazine, Paperback & Hardback)
- Pages: 224
- Followed by: Star Light

Mission of Gravity is a science fiction novel by American writer Hal Clement. The novel was serialized in Astounding Science Fiction magazine in April–July 1953. Its first hardcover book publication was in 1954, and it was first published as a paperback book in 1958. Along with the novel, many editions (and most recent editions) of the book also include "Whirligig World", an essay by Clement on creating the planet Mesklin that was first published in the June 1953 Astounding.

Clement published three sequels: a 1970 novel called Star Light, a 1973 short story called "Lecture Demonstration", and a 2000 short story, "Under". Mission of Gravity was nominated for a "Retro-Hugo" Award for the year 1954.

== Setting ==
The story is set on a very rapidly rotating highly oblate planet named Mesklin; its "day" is just under 18 minutes long, and its surface gravity varies between 700 g at the poles and 3 g at its equator. The story is told from the points of view of one of the local intelligent life forms and a human explorer. The locals are centipede-like, in order to withstand the enormous gravity, and terrified of even small heights, because in 700 g, even a tiny fall is fatal.

== Plot summary ==
The native protagonist, Barlennan, captain of the sailing raft Bree, is on a trading expedition to the equator. Prior to the story's opening, a human scientific rocket has become stranded at one of the planet's poles, where the gravity is too strong to effect a rescue. A member of the scientific team, Charles Lackland, is dispatched to the equator where he has met Barlennan by chance. Even machine aided, Lackland is barely able to function in the 3 g environment, one Barlennan considers incredibly light and a tiny fraction of what his culture is used to.

Lackland teaches the Bree crew English and arranges a deal with Barlennan; in exchange for the humans providing warnings of the violent weather which often plagues trips to the pole, Barlennan will help retrieve the recorded information from the rocket. Communication is achieved through an audio-visual radio built to function in a high-gravity environment, which is treated as magical by other intelligences encountered on the planet.

Along the way to the pole, the ship encounters and overcomes a variety of obstacles, some of which the humans help with using their superior scientific knowledge, and some of which rely on the cunning of Barlennan and his crew. They are captured by various lifeforms similar to themselves, but who live in the lower-gravity areas and have developed projectile weapons and gliders. Gradually, with human help, they gain an understanding of these and manage to escape.

Barlennan has been dissatisfied with the humans' efforts to seemingly avoid explanation of anything scientific, and almost withholds the rocket when they finally reach it; but the humans convince them that a scientific background is needed to understand the advanced equipment, and a deal is reached whereby the humans will educate the Mesklinites.

The novel provides an exposition on how the weather, geology and atmosphere of the seas and the pole are affected by the local conditions, and sees the Mesklinites overcoming their fear of gravity as they learn to view it scientifically, eventually harnessing aerodynamics to make the Bree fly at the poles.

== Reception ==
Mission was the runner-up for the 1955 International Fantasy Award for fiction. Boucher and McComas found Mission "compact and unified, with a good deal of adventurous excitement" and characterized it as "a splendid specimen of science fiction in the grandest of grand manners." In a New York Times book review, J. Francis McComas called the story "an astonishing new kind of sea yarn" and described Barlennan as "the kind of hero we've known and loved all our lives – as canny a mariner as any terrestrial rover who ever combined shrewd business with high adventure".

Wayne Barlowe illustrated the Mesklinites in his Barlowe's Guide to Extraterrestrials.

== Reputation ==
The story is "noteworthy not only as an impressive piece of planet-building, but as the first SF novel built on actual observational data involving another possible solar system", making it an early and often-praised example of macrocosmic worldbuilding hard science fiction. Although Clement has stated that his original calculations concerning the polar gravity of Mesklin were inaccurate — he later estimated the polar gravity should have been approximately 250 g instead of 700 — the exploration of what existence might be like in such extreme conditions is detailed, convincing, and persuasive. The novel is frequently invoked in discussions of the sense of wonder, the sensation of dawning comprehension and understanding of a larger context for a given experience, that many readers of science fiction point to as the reason why they pursue the genre.

The personalities of Clement's alien characters have been criticized as being "too human" or not "alien enough", as failing to be, in the words of John W. Campbell "something that thinks as well as a man, but not like a man".

== Analysis ==
Neil Barron identified the story as displaying several characteristics of the classical epics such as beginning in medias res and a divine intervention of sorts by the assistance provided to the Mesklinites by the human character Lackland.
