= Jerry Pournelle =

American writer and scientist (1933–2017)

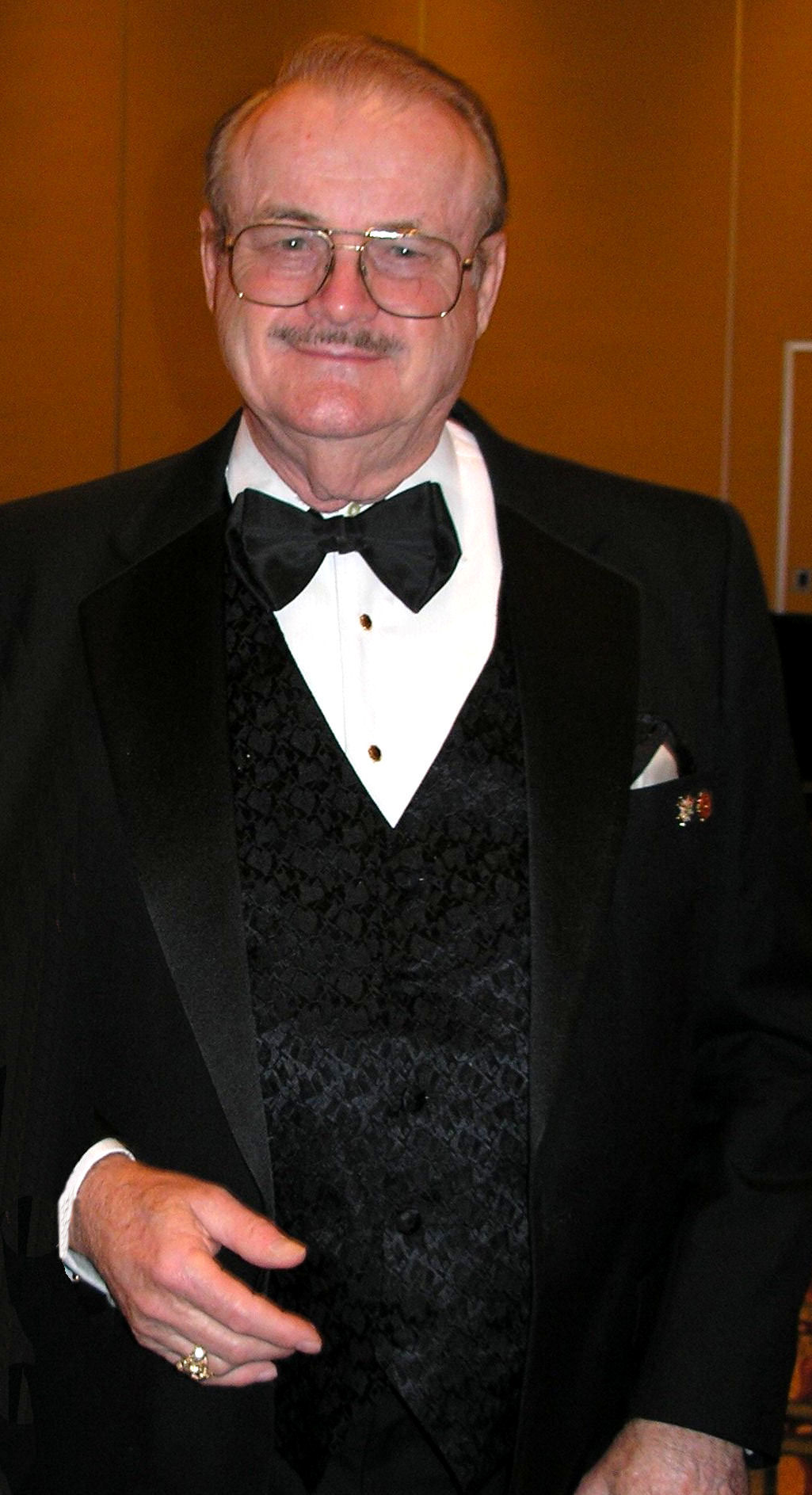
- Pournelle at NASFiC in 2005
- Born: August 7, 1933; Shreveport, Louisiana, U.S.
- Died: September 8, 2017 (aged 84); Studio City, California, U.S.
- Occupations: Novelist; journalist; essayist
- Writing career
- Pen name: Wade Curtis (early work)
- Period: 1971–2017
- Genre: Science fiction
- Website: jerrypournelle.com

Jerry Eugene Pournelle (/pʊərˈnɛl/; August 7, 1933 – September 8, 2017) was an American scientist in the area of operations research and human factors research, a science fiction writer, journalist, and one of the first bloggers. In the 1960s and early 1970s, he worked in the aerospace industry, but eventually focused on his writing career. In an obituary in Gizmodo, he was described as "a tireless ambassador for the future."

Pournelle's hard science fiction writing received multiple awards. In addition to his solo writing, he wrote several novels with collaborators including Larry Niven. Pournelle served a term as President of the Science Fiction and Fantasy Writers of America.

Pournelle's journalism focused primarily on the computer industry, astronomy, and space exploration. From the 1970s until the early 1990s, he contributed to the computer magazine Byte, writing from the viewpoint of an intelligent user, with the oft-cited credo, "We do this stuff so you won't have to." He created one of the first blogs, entitled "Chaos Manor", which included commentary about politics, computer technology, space technology, and science fiction.

Pournelle held paleoconservative political views, which he sometimes expressed in his fiction. He was one of the founders of the Citizens' Advisory Council on National Space Policy, which developed some of the Reagan Administration's space initiatives, including the earliest versions of what would become the Strategic Defense Initiative.

== Early years ==
Pournelle was born in Shreveport, Louisiana, the seat of Caddo Parish in northwestern Louisiana, and later lived with his family in Capleville, Tennessee, an unincorporated area near Memphis. Percival Pournelle, his father, was a radio advertising executive and general manager of several radio stations. Ruth Pournelle, his mother, was a teacher, although during World War II, she worked in a munitions factory.

He attended first grade at St. Anne's Elementary School, in Memphis, which had two grades to a classroom. Beginning with third grade, he attended Coleville Consolidated Elementary School, in Colevile, which had about 25 pupils per grade and four rooms and four teachers for 8 grades. Pournelle attended high school at Christian Brothers College in Memphis, run by the De La Salle Christian Brothers; despite its name, it was a high school at the time.

He served in the United States Army during the Korean War. In 1953–54, after his military service, Pournelle attended the University of Iowa in Iowa City. Subsequently, he studied at the University of Washington, where he received a B.S. in psychology on June 11, 1955; an M.S. in psychology (experimental statistics) on March 21, 1958; and a Ph.D. in political science in March 1964.

His master's thesis is titled "Behavioural observations of the effects of personality needs and leadership in small discussion groups", and is dated 1957. Pournelle's Ph.D. dissertation is titled "The American political continuum; an examination of the validity of the left-right model as an instrument for studying contemporary American political 'isms'".

== Personal life ==
Pournelle married Roberta Jane Isdell in 1959; the couple had five children. His wife, his son, naval officer Phillip, and daughter, archaeologist Jennifer, have also written science fiction in collaboration with their father.

In 2008, Pournelle battled a brain tumor, which appeared to respond favorably to radiation treatment. An August 28, 2008 report on his weblog claimed he was now cancer-free. Pournelle suffered a stroke on December 16, 2014, for which he was hospitalized for a time. By June 2015, he was writing again, though impairment from the stroke had slowed his typing. Pournelle died in his sleep of heart failure at his home in Studio City, California, on September 8, 2017.

== Faith and worldview ==
Pournelle was raised a Unitarian. He converted to Roman Catholicism while attending Christian Brothers College.

Pournelle was introduced to Malthusian principles upon reading the book Road to Survival by the ecologist (and ornithologist) William Vogt, who depicted an Earth denuded of species other than humans, all of them headed for squalor. Concerned about the Malthusian dangers of human overpopulation, and considering the Catholic Church's position on contraception to be untenable, he left the Catholic Church while an undergraduate at the University of Iowa. Pournelle eventually returned to religion, and for a number of years was a high church Anglican, claiming that Anglican theology was virtually identical to Catholic theology, with the exception that the Anglicans accepted as moral the use of birth control.

Pournelle eventually returned to the Catholic Church, as his other beliefs were consistent with the Catholic communion, although he did not agree with the Church's position on birth control. Despite his estrangement from the Catholic Church, he opposed having the government require that Catholic institutions provide access to birth control or abortion. He wrote that Sunday attendance at St. Francis de Sales Catholic Church, in Sherman Oaks, Los Angeles, was part of his family's routine. Upon his death, his family arranged a memorial Mass at the church, on September 16, 2017.

== Career ==
Pournelle was an intellectual protégé of Russell Kirk and Stefan T. Possony. Pournelle wrote numerous publications with Possony, including The Strategy of Technology (1970). The Strategy has been used as a textbook at the United States Military Academy (West Point), the United States Air Force Academy (Colorado Springs), the Air War College, and the National War College.

He told fellow author Robert Heinlein, Pournelle recalled, "that once I got into advance plans at Boeing I probably wrote more science fiction than he did, and I didn't have to put characters in mine". In the late 1950s, while conducting operations research at the company, he envisioned a weapon consisting of massive tungsten rods dropped from high above the Earth. These super-dense, super-fast kinetic energy projectiles delivered enormous destructive force to the target without contaminating the environs with radioactive isotopes, as would occur with a nuclear bomb. Pournelle named his superweapon “Project Thor”. Others called it "Rods from God". Pournelle headed the Human Factors Laboratory at Boeing, where his group did pioneering work on astronaut heat tolerance in extreme environments. His group also did experimental work that resulted in certification of the passenger oxygen system for the Boeing 707 airplane. He later worked as a Systems Analyst in a design and analysis group at the company, where he did strategic analysis of proposed new weapons systems.

In 1964, Pournelle joined the Aerospace Corporation in San Bernardino, California where he was Editor of Project 75, a major study of all ballistic missile technology for the purpose of making recommendations to the US Air Force on investment in technologies required to build the missile force to be deployed in 1975. After Project 75 was completed Pournelle became manager of several advanced concept studies.

At North American Rockwell's Space Division, Pournelle was associate director of operations research, where he took part in the Apollo program and general operations.

He was founding President of the Pepperdine Research Institute. In 1989, Pournelle, Max Hunter, and retired Army Lieutenant General Daniel O. Graham made a presentation to then Vice President Dan Quayle promoting development of the DC-X rocket.

Pournelle was among those who in 1968 signed a pro-Vietnam War advertisement in Galaxy Science Fiction. During the 1970s and 1980s, he also published articles on military tactics and wargaming in the military simulations industry in Avalon Hill's magazine The General and in the Don Lowry's wargaming magazines PanzerFaust and Campaign. That led him into correspondences with some of the early figures in Dungeons & Dragons and other fantasy role-playing games.

Two of his collaborations with Larry Niven reached the top rankings in the New York Times Best Seller List. In 1977, Lucifer's Hammer reached number two. Footfall — wherein Heinlein was a thinly veiled minor character — reached the number one spot in 1986.

Pournelle served as President of the Science Fiction and Fantasy Writers of America in 1973.

In 1994, Pournelle's friendly relationship with Newt Gingrich led to Gingrich securing a government job for Pournelle's son, Richard. At the time, Pournelle and Gingrich were reported to be collaborating on "a science fiction political thriller." Pournelle's relationship with Gingrich was long established even then, as Pournelle had written the preface to Gingrich's book, Window of Opportunity (1985).

Years after Byte shuttered, Pournelle wrote his Chaos Manor column online. He reprised it at Byte.com, which he helped launch with journalist Gina Smith, John C. Dvorak, and others. However, after a shakeup, he announced that rather than stay at United Business Media, he would follow Smith, Dvorak, and 14 other news journalists to start an independent tech and politics site called anewdomain.net. As an active director of that site and others it launched, Pournelle wrote, edited, and worked with young writers and journalists on the craft of writing about science and tech.

== Fiction ==
Beginning during his tenure at Boeing Company, Pournelle submitted science fiction short stories to John W. Campbell, the editor of Astounding Science Fiction (later called Analog Science Fiction and Fact), but Campbell did not accept any of Pournelle's submissions until shortly before Campbell's death in 1971, when he accepted for publication Pournelle's novelette "Peace with Honor." From the beginning, Pournelle's work has engaged strong military themes. Several books are centered on a fictional mercenary infantry force known as Falkenberg's Legion. There are strong parallels between these stories and the Childe Cycle mercenary stories by Gordon R. Dickson, as well as Heinlein's Starship Troopers, although Pournelle's work takes far fewer technological leaps than either of these.

Pournelle was one of the few close friends of H. Beam Piper and was granted by Piper the rights to produce stories set in Piper's Terro-Human Future History. This right has been recognized by the Piper estate. Pournelle worked for some years on a sequel to Space Viking but abandoned this in the early 1990s, however John F. Carr and Mike Robertson completed this sequel, entitled The Last Space Viking, and it was published in 2011.

In 2013, Variety reported that motion picture rights to Pournelle's novel Janissaries had been acquired by the newly formed Goddard Film Group, headed by Gary Goddard. The IMDb website reported that the film was in development, and that husband-and-wife writing team, Judith and Garfield Reeves-Stevens, had written the screenplay.

=== Pseudonyms and collaborations ===
Pournelle began fiction writing non-SF work under a pseudonym in 1965. His early SF was published under the name "Wade Curtis", in Analog and other magazines. Some works were also published under the name "J.E. Pournelle".

In the mid-1970s, Pournelle began a fruitful collaboration with Larry Niven; he has also collaborated on novels with Roland J. Green, Michael F. Flynn, and Steven Barnes, and collaborated as an editor on an anthology series The Endless Frontier with John F. Carr.

In 2010, his daughter Jennifer R. Pournelle (writing as J.R. Pournelle), an archaeology professor, e-published a novel Outies, an authorized sequel to the Mote in God's Eye series.

== Journalism and tech writing ==
=== Computing at Chaos Manor ===
Jerry Pournelle talks about Science Fiction and lots of computers at home. (1990)

Pournelle began using a computer to write in 1977 on the advice of his "mad" friend Dan MacLean. He wrote the "Computing at Chaos Manor" column in Byte, describing experiences with computer hardware and software, some purchased and some sent by vendors for review, at his home office. Because Pournelle was then, according to the magazine, "virtually Byte's only writer who was a mere user—he didn't create compilers and computers, he merely used them", it began as "The User's Column" in July 1980. Subtitled "Omikron TRS-80 Boards, NEWDOS+, and Sundry Other Matters", an Editor's Note accompanied the article:

The other day we were sitting around the Byte offices listening to software and hardware explosions going off around us in the microcomputer world. We wondered, "Who could cover some of the latest developments for us in a funny, frank (and sometimes irascible) style?" The phone rang. It was Jerry Pournelle with an idea for a funny, frank (and sometimes irascible) series of articles to be presented in Byte on a semi-regular (i.e.: every 2 to 3 months) basis, which would cover the wild microcomputer goings-on at the Pournelle House ("Chaos Manor") in Southern California. We said yes. Herewith the first installment ...

Pournelle stated that:

This will be a column by and for computer users, and with rare exceptions I won't discuss anything I haven't installed and implemented here in Chaos Manor. At Chaos Manor we have computer users ranging in sophistication from my 9-year-old through a college-undergraduate assistant and up to myself. (Not that I'm the last word in sophistication, but I do sit here and pound this machine a lot; if I can't get something to work, it takes an expert.) Fair warning, then: the very nature of this column limits its scope. I can't talk about anything I can't run on my machines, nor am I likely to discuss things I have no use for.

Among recurring characters were Pournelle's family members, friends, and many computers. He introduced to readers "my friend Ezekiel, who happens to be a Cromemco Z-2 with iCom 8-inch soft-sectored floppy disk drives"; he also owned a TRS-80 Model I, and the first subject discussed in the column was an add-on that permitted it to use the same data and CP/M applications as the Cromemco. The next column appeared in December 1980 with the subtitle "BASIC, Computer Languages, and Computer Adventures"; Ezekiel II, a Compupro S-100 CP/M system, debuted in March 1983. Other computers received nicknames, such as Zorro, Pournelle's "colorful" Zenith Z-100, and Lucy Van Pelt, a "fussbudget" IBM PC; he referred to generic PC compatibles as "PClones". Pournelle often denounced companies that announced vaporware, sarcastically writing that they would arrive "Real Soon Now" (later abbreviated to just "RSN"), and those that used software copy protection. As part of a redesign in June 1984, the magazine renamed the popular column to "Computing at Chaos Manor", and the accompanying letter column became "Chaos Manor Mail".

Pournelle preferred 8-inch floppy disks to 5 1/4-inch disks as late as 1982, and still used "Zeke" to write as late as 1987, but admitted that he would soon have to use PCs because tools like Borland Sidekick were unavailable. He hesitated, Pournelle said, because Niven would buy two exact copies of his writing computer and software. He announced in February 1989 that the Smithsonian had asked for "Zeke" as part of a history of computing. A memorable column in August 1989 was "The Great Power Spike", which gives a digital necropsy of his electronic equipment after high voltage transmission wires dropped onto the power line for his neighborhood.

After the print version of Byte ended publication in the United States, Pournelle continued publishing the column for the online version and international print editions of Byte. In July 2006, Pournelle and Byte declined to renew their contract and Pournelle moved the column to his own web site, Chaos Manor Reviews.

=== Other technical writing ===
Pournelle claimed to be the first author to have written a published book contribution using a word processor on a personal computer, in 1977.

In the 1980s, Pournelle was an editor and columnist for Survive, a survivalist magazine. He wrote the monthly column "The Micro Revolution" for Popular Computing from April 1984 until the magazine's closure in December 1985. The column focused on the ways microcomputers were reshaping society.

In 2011, Pournelle joined journalist Gina Smith, pundit John C. Dvorak, political cartoonist Ted Rall, and several other Byte.com staff reporters to launch an independent tech and political news site, aNewDomain.net Pournelle served as director of aNewDomain until his death.

After 1998, Pournelle maintained a website with a daily online journal, "View from Chaos Manor," a blog dating from before the use of that term. It is a collection of his "Views" and "Mail" from a large variety of readers. This is a continuation of his 1980s blog-like online journal on GEnie. He said he resists using the term "blog" because he considered the word ugly, and because he maintained that his "View" is primarily a vehicle for writing rather than a collection of links. In his book Dave Barry in Cyberspace, humorist Dave Barry has fun with Pournelle's guru column in Byte magazine.

== Software ==
Pournelle, in collaboration with his wife, Roberta (who was an expert on reading education) wrote the commercial education software program called Reading: The Learning Connection.

== Politics ==
Pournelle served as campaign research director for the mayoral campaign of 1969 for Los Angeles Mayor Sam Yorty (Democrat), working under campaign director Henry Salvatori. The election took place on May 27, 1969. Pournelle was later named Executive Assistant to the Mayor in charge of research in September 1969, but resigned from the position after two weeks. After leaving Yorty's office, in 1970 he was a consultant to the Professional Educators of Los Angeles (PELA), a group opposed to the unionization of school teachers in LA.

He is sometimes quoted as describing his politics as "somewhere to the right of Genghis Khan." Pournelle resisted others classifying him into any particular political group, but acknowledged the approximate accuracy of the term paleoconservatism as applying to him. He distinguished his conservativism from the alternative neoconservatism, noting that he had been drummed out of the Conservative movement by "the egregious Frum", referring to prominent neoconservative, David Frum. Notably, Pournelle opposed the Gulf War and the Iraq War, maintaining that the money would be better spent developing energy technologies for the United States. According to a Wall Street Journal article, "Pournelle estimates that for what the Iraq war has cost so far, the United States could have paid for a network of nuclear power stations sufficient to achieve energy independence, and bankrupt the Arabs for once and for all."

=== Pournelle chart ===
Pournelle created the Pournelle chart in his doctoral dissertation, a 2-dimensional coordinate system used to distinguish political ideologies. It is a cartesian diagram in which the X-axis gauges opinion toward state and centralized government (farthest right being state worship, farthest left being the idea of a state as the "ultimate evil"), and the Y-axis measures the belief that all problems in society have rational solutions (top being complete confidence in rational planning, bottom being complete lack of confidence in rational planning).

=== Strategic Defense Initiative ===
In a 1997 article, Norman Spinrad wrote that Pournelle had written the SDI portion of Ronald Reagan's State of the Union Address, as part of a plan to use SDI to get more money for space exploration using the larger defense budget. Pournelle wrote in response that while the Citizens' Advisory Council on National Space Policy "wrote parts of Reagan's 1983 SDI speech, and provided much of the background for the policy, we certainly did not write the speech… We were not trying to boost space, we were trying to win the Cold War". The council's first report in 1980 became the transition team policy paper on space for the incoming Reagan administration. The third report was quoted in the Reagan "Star Wars" speech.

== Pournelle's laws ==
Pournelle suggested several "laws". He used the term "Pournelle's law" for the expression "One user, one CPU". He later amended this to "One user, at least one CPU" in a column in InfoWorld. He also used the term "Pournelle's law" for "Silicon is cheaper than iron." That is, a computer is cheaper to upgrade than replace. A second aspect of this law was Pournelle's prediction that hard disk drives would eventually be replaced by solid-state memory, although he admitted that bubble memory had failed to do so as he had expected. He has also used "Pournelle's law" to apply to the importance of checking cable connections when diagnosing computer problems: "You'll find by and large, the trouble is a cable." Another Pournelle's Law is "If you don’t know what you’re doing, deal with those who do".

=== Pournelle's iron law of bureaucracy ===
Another "law" of his is "Pournelle's iron law of bureaucracy":

In any bureaucracy, the people devoted to the benefit of the bureaucracy itself always get in control and those dedicated to the goals that the bureaucracy is supposed to accomplish have less and less influence, and sometimes are eliminated entirely.

He eventually restated it as:

Pournelle's Iron Law of Bureaucracy states that in any bureaucratic organization there will be two kinds of people: First, there will be those who are devoted to the goals of the organization. Examples are dedicated classroom teachers in an educational bureaucracy, many of the engineers and launch technicians and scientists at NASA, even some agricultural scientists and advisors in the former Soviet Union collective farming administration. Secondly, there will be those dedicated to the organization itself. Examples are many of the administrators in the education system, many professors of education, many teachers union officials, much of the NASA headquarters staff, etc. The Iron Law states that in every case the second group will gain and keep control of the organization. It will write the rules, and control promotions within the organization.

His blog, "The View from Chaos Manor", often references apparent examples of the law. Some of Pournelle's standard themes that recur in the stories are: welfare states become self-perpetuating, building a technological society requires a strong defense and the rule of law, and "those who forget history are condemned to repeat it".

== Awards ==
Pournelle never won a Hugo Award. He said, "Money will get you through times of no Hugos better than Hugos will get you through times of no money." The Mote in God's Eye and Inferno were both nominated for a Nebula Award for Best Novel in 1975.

- Bronze Medal, American Security Council, 1964
- John W. Campbell Award for Best New Writer of 1973
- Inkpot Award, 1979
- Prometheus Hall of Fame Jerry Pournelle / John F. Carr (editors), The Survival of Freedom 1991
- Prometheus Award for Fallen Angels 1992
- Seiun Award for Foreign Novel (in Japanese translation): 1998, Fallen Angels
- Heinlein Society Award (with frequent co-author Larry Niven) 2005
- National Space Society Robert A. Heinlein Memorial Award "for lifetime achievement in promoting the goal of a free, spacefaring civilization." 2016

== Bibliography ==
=== Scholarly ===
- "The SSX concept." Journal of Practical Applications in Space 4 (1993): 161–181. (The SSX concept became the DC-X, the first successful reusable vertical landing rocket craft.)

=== Non-fiction ===
- Stability and National Security (Air Force Directorate of Doctrines, Concepts and Objectives) (1968)
- The Strategy of Technology with Stephan T. Possony, PhD and Francis X. Kane, PhD (1970)
- A Step Farther Out: The Velikovsky Affair. Galaxy Science Fiction, February 1975, pp. 74–84.
- A Step Farther Out (1981)
- The users guide to small computers (1984)
- Mutually Assured Survival (1984)
- Adventures in Microland (1985)
- Guide to Disc Operating System and Easy Computing (1989)
- Pournelle's PC Communications Bible: The Ultimate Guide to Productivity With a Modem with Michael Banks (1992)
- Jerry Pournelle's Guide to DOS and Easy Computing: DOS over Easy (1992)
- Jerry Pournelle's Windows With an Attitude (1995)
- PC Hardware: The Definitive Guide (2003) with Bob Thompson
- 1001 Computer Words You Need to Know (2004)

=== Fiction ===
- Red Heroin (as Wade Curtis) (1969)
- Red Dragon (as Wade Curtis) (1970)
- Novelisation of the movie Escape from the Planet of the Apes (1973)
- A Spaceship for the King (1973) expanded as King David's Spaceship (1980)
- High Justice (1974)
- Birth of Fire (1976)
- West of Honor (1976) (later integrated into Falkenberg's Legion, and as Arrarat incorporated into The Prince)
- The Mercenary (1977)
- Exiles to Glory (1977)
- Janissaries (1979)
- Men of War (1993)
- Starswarm (1998)
- Prince of Mercenaries (2002)
- Janissaries IV: Mamelukes (2020)
- Starborn and Godsons (2020)

=== Collaborations ===
==== With Larry Niven ====
- The Mote in God's Eye (1974) (with Larry Niven)
- Inferno (1976) (with Larry Niven)
- Lucifer's Hammer (1977) (with Larry Niven)
- Oath of Fealty (1981) (with Larry Niven)
- Footfall (1985) (with Larry Niven)
- The Legacy of Heorot (1987) (with Larry Niven & Steven Barnes)
- Fallen Angels (1991) (with Larry Niven & Michael Flynn) (Prometheus Award) ISBN 0-7434-3582-6. Electronic edition free at the Baen Free Library
- The Gripping Hand (1993) (with Larry Niven) also known as The Moat Around Murcheson's Eye (UK edition)
- Beowulf's Children (1995) (with Steven Barnes & Larry Niven) also known as The Dragons of Heorot (1995) (UK edition)
- The Burning City (2000) (with Larry Niven)
- Burning Tower (2005) (sequel to The Burning City, with Larry Niven)
- Escape from Hell (2009) (with Larry Niven)

==== With others ====
- The Houses of the Kzinti (with S. M. Stirling and Dean Ing)
- The Children's Hour (with S. M. Stirling)
- The Prince anthology (with S. M. Stirling)
- Go Tell The Spartans (2002) (with S. M. Stirling)
- Janissaries II: Clan and Crown (1982) (with Roland J. Green)
- Janissaries III: Storms of Victory (1987) (with Roland J. Green)
- Tran (with Roland J. Green, single-volume combination of the never completed second and third Janissaries novels)
- Higher Education (with Charles Sheffield)

=== Series ===
- Heorot
- CoDominium
- Janissaries series

=== Other media ===
- Triangulation – Dr. Pournelle was interviewed by Leo Laporte for 2 episodes of Triangulation (Episodes 90 and 95) in 2013.
- This Week in Tech – Dr. Pournelle has appeared a number of times as one of the panelists on the podcast This Week in Tech, including episode 427 on October 13, 2013; episode 463 on June 22, 2014; and with Larry Niven in episode 468 on July 27, 2014.
- He also appeared in the science documentary film Target ... Earth? (1980).

=== Anthology (as editor) ===
- 20 20 Vision (1974)
- The Endless Frontier (anthology series, Vols II-IV edited with John F. Carr), Vols I-IV (1979–92)
- Black Holes (1981)
- The Survival of Freedom (1981) with John F. Carr
- Nebula Award Stories Sixteen (1982) with John F. Carr
- The Endless Frontier, Vol. II (1985) with John F. Carr
- Imperial Stars, vol 1, The Stars at War (1986)
- Imperial Stars, vol 2, Republic and Empire (1987)
- Imperial Stars, vol 3, The Crash of Empire (1989)
- Far Frontiers (anthology series, Vols I-VII edited with Jim Baen), Vols I-VII (1985–86)
- There Will be War (anthology series, Vols I-IX edited with John F. Carr), Vols I–X
