= List of McDonnell Douglas DC-X launches =

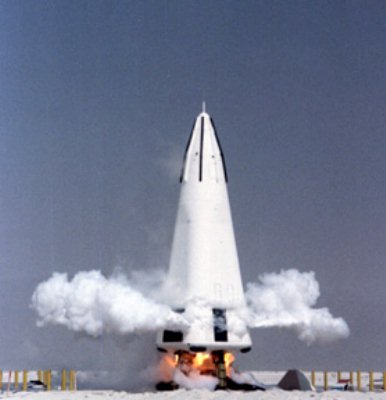
The DC-XA Clipper Graham

Between 1993 and 1996, the McDonnell Douglas DC-X, also known as the "Delta Clipper", conducted twelve low-altitude suborbital test launches to verify the configuration and handling of the uncrewed single-stage-to-orbit Delta Clipper design, which was proposed to the United States Department of Defense and the National Aeronautics and Space Administration (NASA) for use as a reuseable launch vehicle. Claimed as the first rocket to conduct a vertical landing on Earth, the DC-X was a one-third scale demonstrator for the proposed operational Delta Clipper vehicle.

After the first three flights Strategic Defense Initiative Organization funding for the test project was cancelled; the remaining test program was conducted by NASA and the Advanced Research Projects Agency. Following the eighth test flight, the vehicle was transferred fully to NASA and the vehicle was modified to DC-XA configuration, also known as "Clipper Graham" after General Daniel O. Graham who had died in 1995 after supporting the Delta Clipper project.

Of the overall test program, ten of the vehicle's launches were fully successful; the fifth test flight was aborted early in the flight following an on-board explosion but the vehicle was successfully recovered. The twelfth and final flight saw one of the vehicle's landing legs fail to extend; on landing, when the vehicle tipped over onto its unsupported corner, a liquid oxygen tank ruptured and exploded, the ensuing fire destroying the modified DC-XA vehicle and ending the program. Despite the loss the program was considered overall to have been a success.

== Launch history ==
Flight No.	Date and time of takeoff (UTC)	Vehicle	Launch site	Suborbital apogee	Outcome	Duration	Reference
1	18 August 1993; 23:43	DC-X	White Sands Space Harbor	46 m (151 ft)	Success	59 sec	
1	Control system and vertical landing capability test. Demonstrated hovering ability and 350 foot (110 m) horizontal translation.						
2	11 September 1993; 18:12	DC-X	White Sands Space Harbor	92 m (302 ft)	Success	66 sec	
2	Ground effects and ascent-and-landing mode control test.						
3	30 September 1993; 17:30	DC-X	White Sands Space Harbor	370 m (1,210 ft)	Success	72 sec	
3	Aerostability test; vehicle conducted 180° roll.						
4	20 June 1994; 15:42	DC-X	White Sands Space Harbor	870 m (2,850 ft)	Success	2 min 16 sec	
4	First flight with fully loaded propellant tanks and operational radar altimeter.						
5	27 June 1994; 15:37	DC-X	White Sands Space Harbor	790 m (2,590 ft)	Partial failure	78 sec	
5	Flight aborted after hydrogen explosion on launch; autoland capabilities demonstrated.						
6	16 May 1995; 16:40	DC-X	White Sands Space Harbor	1.33 km (0.83 mi; 4,400 ft)	Success	2 min 4 sec	
6	Flight envelope expansion test.						
7	12 June 1995; 15:38	DC-X	White Sands Space Harbor	1.74 km (1.08 mi; 5,700 ft)	Success	2 min 12 sec	
7	AOA envelope expansion, first reaction control system usage.						
8	7 July 1995; 14:02	DC-X	White Sands Space Harbor	2 km (1.2 mi; 6,600 ft)	Success	2 min 4 sec	
8	Turnaround maneuver demonstrated; hard landing resulted in damage to the aeroshell.						
9	18 May 1996; 15:14	DC-XA	White Sands Space Harbor	244 m (801 ft)	Success	62 sec	
9	First flight following modification to DC-XA configuration; slow landing resulted in aeroshell fire.						
10	7 June 1996; 17:15	DC-XA	White Sands Space Harbor	590 m (1,940 ft)	Success	64 sec	
10	Maximum structural stress test.						
11	8 June 1996; 19:17	DC-XA	White Sands Space Harbor	3.14 km (1.95 mi; 10,300 ft)	Success	2 min 22 sec	
11	Demonstration of 26-hour rapid turnaround; altitude and duration record set.						
12	31 July 1996; 20:15	DC-XA	White Sands Space Harbor	1.25 km (0.78 mi; 4,100 ft)	Partial success	2 min 20 sec	
12	Successful maneuvering test; vehicle destroyed on landing when landing strut failed to extend and LOX tank exploded.						
