= Citizens' Advisory Council on National Space Policy =

Former space advocacy organization

The Citizen's Advisory Council on National Space Policy was a group of prominent US citizens concerned with the space policy of the United States of America. It is no longer active.

== History ==
The Council's roots date to 1980 as a group which prepared many of the Reagan Administration Transition Team's space policy papers. The Council was formally created in 1981 by joint action of the American Astronautical Society and the L5 Society to develop a detailed and technically feasible space policy to further the national interest. Participant Gregory Benford would in 1994 describe the activities of the council:

The Council, a raucous bunch with feisty opinions, met at the spacious home of science fiction author Larry Niven. The men mostly talked hard-edge tech, the women policy. Pournelle stirred the pot and turned up the heat. Amid the buffet meals, saunas and hot tubs, well-stocked open bar, and myriad word processors, fancies simmered and ideas cooked, some emerging better than half-baked...Finally, we settled on recommending a position claiming at least the moral high ground, if not high orbits. Defense was inevitably more stabilizing than relying on hair-trigger offense, we argued. It was also more principled. And eventually, the Soviet Union might not even be the enemy, we said - though we had no idea it would fade so fast. When that happened, defenses would still be useful against any attacker, especially rogue nations bent on a few terrorist attacks. There were plenty of science fiction stories, some many decades old, dealing with that possibility. The Advisory Council met in August of 1984 in a mood of high celebration. Their pioneering work had yielded fruits unimaginable in 1982 - Reagan himself had proposed the Strategic Defense Initiative, suggesting that nuclear weapons be made "impotent and obsolete". The Soviets were clearly staggered by the prospect. (Years later I heard straight from a senior Soviet advisor that the U.S. SDI had been the straw that broke the back of the military's hold on foreign policy. That seems to be the consensus now among the diplomatic community, though politically SDI is a common whipping boy, its funding cut.)

Participant David Mitchell added this history update on March 18, 2021:

Dr. Pournelle held many meetings at “Chaos Manor”, his home in Studio City. These were more formal meetings than the annual party/meetings Gregory Benford describes at Larry Niven’s home. As someone who worked closely with Dr. P. on BIX (the Byte Information Exchange), it was a natural follow-on to assist when and where I could on council-related matters. Henry Vanderbilt’s Space Access Society events and meetings helped focus the agenda. I created the Lunar Teleoperations Model I to test telepresence research and generate publicity. The critical council focus was on affordable access to space during the period of the late 1980’s to the late 1990’s. Meetings were held at Chaos Manor, the “Making Orbit 93” conference in Berkeley, and in Las Cruces, NM during DC-X test flight events. I hosted events at various space activist forums and created events such as “Minds In Space”.

The critical path in affordable access to space was (and is) SSTO – single stage to orbit. In meeting with Max Hunter, he was kind enough to provide me a copy of RITA, his “Reusable Interplanetary Transport Approach”. Daniel Graham ruled out queries for mass drivers to move items to LEO, due to treaty violations. I have been discussing with Benford the concept of lunar mass drivers for zero cost transport of materials to Mars. (I favor solar powered mass drivers, he prefers plutonium reactors to prevent downtime during the 14 day lunar night.)

To achieve affordable access, the council focused on 2 paths. The first was X-projects and demonstrators. Peter Diamandis really stepped up to the plate with the X-Prize Foundation. Pournelle, Hunter, and Graham were able to get $60 million of BMBO money allocated to DC-X. Dr. Gaubatz, John Garvey, Andy Karlson and many others made the DC-X happen – over and over again. The DC-X marked the “birth” and pivot point of demonstrating reusability. Pournelle always kept emphasizing “bending metal”, something Elon Musk has embraced and brought to a new level.

The second path was (and still is) creating an environment legally to allow the creation of profit-seeking new space companies. This meant working the beltway on a non-partisan basis (so much easier then than now). Pournelle once told me of a meeting he had with Gingrich in his kitchen at Chaos Manor. Critical laws were enacted moving launch process to the DOT and therefore to the FAA, creating a bit of symmetry between civilian air and the new civilian space domains. Always aware that for a profit-seeking company to be successful, NASA must take the long-term research and exploratory role, with affordable access to space moving incrementally to the private sector to unleash the growth potential.

I don’t think any of us ever thought we would hit a dual jackpot of Elon Musk and Jeff Bezos.

== Meetings ==
November, 1980
July, 1983
May 9–11, 1986

? 1993

? 1995
August 10, 1997

== Reports ==
Spring, 1981 28 September 1983. Substantial portions of this report were later published in the book Mutual Assured Survival (Baen Books, 1984) by Jerry Pournelle and Dean Ing.

Spring, 1986

February 15, 1989

March 20, 1994

== Membership ==
Jerry Pournelle, Chairman

=== Astronauts ===
Buzz Aldrin, Gerald Carr, Fred Haise, Phil Chapman, Pete Conrad

=== Aerospace industry ===
George Merrick (North American Rockwell, Space Division), George Gould, Gordon Woodcock, Gary Hudson, George Koopman, Maxwell Hunter, Art Dula

=== Space scientists and engineers ===
Lowell Wood, G. Harry Stine, Eric Laursen, Chuck Lindley, James Benford, Maxwell Hunter, George Gould

=== Military officers (retired) ===
Lt. General Daniel O. Graham, USA Ret'd; Brigadier General Robert Richardson, USAF Ret'd; Major General Stewart Meyer; USA Ret'd, Col. Jack Coakley, USA Ret'd; Col. Francis X. Kane, USAF Ret'd.

=== Computer scientists ===
Marvin Minsky, Danny Hillis, John McCarthy, David Mitchell

=== Science fiction authors and publishers ===
Poul Anderson, Greg Bear, Robert A. Heinlein, Gregory Benford, Dean Ing, Steven Barnes, Jim Baen, Larry Niven

=== Others ===
Stefan T. Possony, Bjo Trimble, Alexander C. Pournelle, James Miller Vaughn, Jr.
