= Strategy of Technology =

Doctrine on how countries use technology to their advantage

The Strategy of Technology doctrine involves a country using its advantage in technology to create and deploy weapons of sufficient power and numbers so as to overawe or beggar its opponents, forcing them to spend their limited resources on developing hi-tech countermeasures and straining their economy.

In 1983, the US Defense Intelligence Agency established a classified program, Project Socrates, led by physicist Michael Sekora, to discover why the United States was losing its economic competitiveness to Japan and other countries.

The Strategy of Technology is described in the eponymous book written by Stefan T. Possony, Jerry Pournelle and Francis X. Kane (Col., USAF, and ret.) in 1970. This was required reading in the U.S. service academies, the Air War College, and the National War College during the latter half of the Cold War.

== Cold War ==
The classic example of the successful deployment of this strategy was the nuclear build-up between the U.S. and U.S.S.R. during the Cold War.

Some observers believe that the Vietnam War was a necessary attritive component to this war — Soviet industrial capacity was diverted to conventional arms in North Vietnam, rather than development of new weapons and nuclear weapons — but evidence would need to be found that the then-current administration of the US saw it thus. Current consensus and evidence holds that it was but a failed defensive move in the Cold War, in the context of the Domino Doctrine.

The coup-de-grace is variously opined to be Stealth technology especially as embodied in the cruise missile, which would have required an unattainable number of installations to secure the Soviet border; the Gulf War, which proved stealth and easily overcame Soviet-doctrine Iraqi forces; or Ronald Reagan's Strategic Defense Initiative, a clear attempt to obsolesce the Soviet nuclear arsenal, creating an immense expense for the Soviets to maintain parity.

== Opposing views and controversies ==
It is argued that the strategy was not a great success in the Cold War; that the Soviet Union did little to try to keep up with the SDI system, and that the War in Afghanistan caused a far greater drain on Soviet resources. However, the Soviets spent a colossal amount of money on their Buran space shuttle in an attempt to compete with a perceived military threat from the American Space Shuttle program, which was to be used in the SDI.

There is a further consideration. It is not seriously in doubt that despite the excellent education and training of Soviet technologists and scientists, it was the nations of Europe and North America, in particular the United States, which made most of the running in technical development.

The Soviet Union had some technical breakthroughs of their own. For example: the 15% efficiency advantage of Soviet rocket engines which used exhaust gases to power the fuel pumps, or the VA-111 Shkval supersonic cavitation torpedo. It was also able to use both its espionage arm and the ability of central planning to concentrate resources.

But the United States found a way to use its opponent's strengths for its own purposes. In the late 1990s, it emerged that many stolen technological secrets were funnelled by an arm of American intelligence to the Soviet Union. The documents were real. They were of versions of the product which contained a critical but not obvious flaw.

Such was the complexity and depth of the stolen secrets that to check them, would have required an effort almost as great as developing a similar product from scratch. Such an effort was possible in nations of the West because the cost could be defrayed by commercial sales. In Soviet states this was not an option. This sort of technological jiu-jitsu may set the pattern of future engagements.
