= Stefan Thomas Possony =

Austrian-American economist and military strategist

- Born: March 15, 1913; Vienna, Austria
- Died: April 26, 1995 (aged 82); Los Altos, California, United States
- Occupations: Economist, Military Strategy
- Known for: Strategic Defense Initiative

Stefan Thomas Possony (March 15, 1913 – April 26, 1995) was an Austrian-born US economist and military strategist and a Senior Fellow and director of International Studies at the Hoover Institution.

Possony was an academic specialist in communism who studied their warfare strategies. According to his friend Jerry Pournelle, the United States would not have won the Cold War without Possony.

He advocated for defense in the event of a nuclear attack, and thus conceived of the Strategic Defense Initiative (SDI).

== Early career ==
Born in 1913 in Vienna, Austria, Possony graduated in 1930 from the University of Vienna in History and Economics and with a PhD in political science. He was employed by the foreign ministry and, after 1934, assisted in the efforts of the Schuschnigg government to resist Hitler's anschluss. In March 1938, after Austria was annexed by Nazi Germany, he emigrated first to Czechoslovakia and then when Germany occupied that country, in March 1939, he fled to France. Prior to emigrating there, in August 1938, he had been one of the participants in the Colloque Walter Lippmann, which aimed strive for the restoration of classical liberal ideas, which had seen a decline in interest after the 1920s and 1930s. With that purpose in mind, Possony went to work with the French Foreign Affairs ministry as a counselor in psychological warfare, and he was active as a consultant with the French Armed Forces.

After France was occupied by the German Army in World War II, Possony, who had been on the Gestapo's wanted list for opposing Austria's annexation by Germany, was taken into custody but was subsequently able to escape.

He planned to flee over the Spanish border but was fortunate to gain passage for himself and his first wife to French Algeria as the Wehrmacht occupied Paris in 1940. From there, he managed to get passage to the United States, where he worked with US Military Intelligence.

He was appointed to a position at Princeton University. He later became a professor at Georgetown University and directed graduate studies for a number of students including active service military officers while he remained a consultant to the Pentagon. Possony was one of the analysts who predicted the date of the first Soviet nuclear test.

== Later career ==
Possony later worked at Stanford University. He was with William Kintner and Robert Strausz-Hupé a coauthor of the influential Cold War strategy treatise The Protracted Conflict, and in 1968 was co-author with Jerry Pournelle and Francis X. Kane of The Strategy of Technology. One of the chapters of Strategy of Technology was "Assured Survival," an argument against the prevailing strategy of "Assured Destruction" that argued strongly for strategic defense including defense against ICBMs.

He was a Senior Fellow and director of International Studies at the Hoover Institution. In 1980 he participated in the Citizens' Advisory Council on National Space Policy, which wrote the space strategy policy for the transition team of the incoming Reagan administration. The council, which included General Daniel O. Graham, advocated the development of anti-ballistic missile systems, including space-based defense weapons, ground laser systems with mirrors in orbit, and nuclear defensive weapons to intercept massive multiple ICBM attacks. In that position, he helped to influence Ronald Reagan, who in 1983, initiated the development of such a system, the Strategic Defense Initiative.

In 1982, Possony was a cofounder of the International Strategic Studies Association.

== Family ==
Possony met the woman who would become his wife in the United States after he moved there from Spain. Regina Golbinder Possony, like her future husband, had had to flee her native Germany as a result of Adolf Hitler's rise to power. She had been a survivor of Stalin's prison camps and had fled to the Soviet Union from Germany with her father and his family, who, as both a Jew and a Communist, had little likelihood of survival. As Stalinist policy was to send any such refugees to the camps, that was a stark but better alternative to remaining in Nazi Germany.

Her family's condition in the camps was improved somewhat by her taking advantage of her acquaintance with Albert Einstein which had been acquired in her youth on a family visit to the United States. She wrote Einstein a letter from the Soviet prison camp addressed to "Dr. Albert Einstein, United States of America," which was duly delivered to him by the US Post Office at Princeton University. Einstein took the trouble to reply and even included a small package of food and hygienic goods. That reportedly raised her status somewhat in Stalin's estimation.

After Stefan had a stroke in 1985, Regina Golbinder Possony singlehandedly kept him alive for ten years when no one expected him to live a single month longer. He died in Los Altos, California, in 1995.

== Publications ==
- Possony, S. Th. (1938). Die Wehrwirtschaft des totalen Krieges. Gerold & Co.Possony, S. T. (1953). A Century of Conflict. Communist Techniques of World Revolution. Henry Regnery Company.
- Possony, S. T. (1960). "American Strategy for the Nuclear Age". In Hahn, W. F., Neff, J. C. (eds.). 11. Communist Psychological Warfare. Anchor Books (Doubleday).
- Possony, S. T. (1964). Strategie des Friedens. Sicherheit und Fortschritt im Atomzeitalter. Verlag Wissenschaft und Politik.
- Possony, S. T., Pournelle, J. E. (1970). The Strategy of Technology: Winning the Decisive War. University Press of Cambridge. ISBN 978-0-8424-0015-2.
- Possony, S. T. (1974). Waking up the Giant: The Strategy for American Victory and World Freedom. Arlington House. ISBN 978-0-87000-206-9.

== See also ==
- World Anti-Communist League
