= Robert C. Richardson III =

United States Air Force general

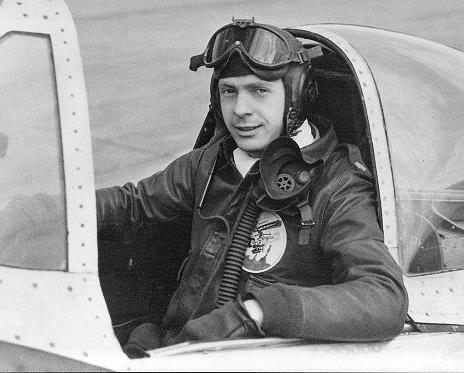
- Richardson in his P-47 Thunderbolt
- Born: Robert Charlwood Richardson III; January 5, 1918; Rockford, Illinois, U.S.
- Died: January 2, 2011 (aged 92); Alexandria, Virginia, U.S.
- Burial place: West Point Cemetery
- Relatives: Robert C. Richardson Jr. (father)
- Military career
- Allegiance: United States
- Branch: United States Air Force
- Service years: 1939–1967
- Rank: Brigadier general
- Commands: 365th Fighter Group; 4th Fighter Wing
- Known for: Laconia Incident
- Wars: World War II
- Awards: Legion of Merit (3); Air Medal; Croix de Guerre

Robert Charlwood Richardson III (January 5, 1918 – January 2, 2011) was an American military officer of the United States Army Air Corps, and subsequently the United States Air Force, eventually attaining the rank of brigadier general. A leader in the early days of the US Air Force, he was a renowned expert in tactical nuclear warfare, NATO, and military long range planning.

He is known for ordering the sinking of German U-boats who were rescuing survivors of the RMS Laconia, a British passenger ship, which had been sunk by a German U-boat. Between 1,658 and 1,757 people were killed during the Laconia Incident, mostly Italian POWs but also over 50 British women and children.

== Early career ==
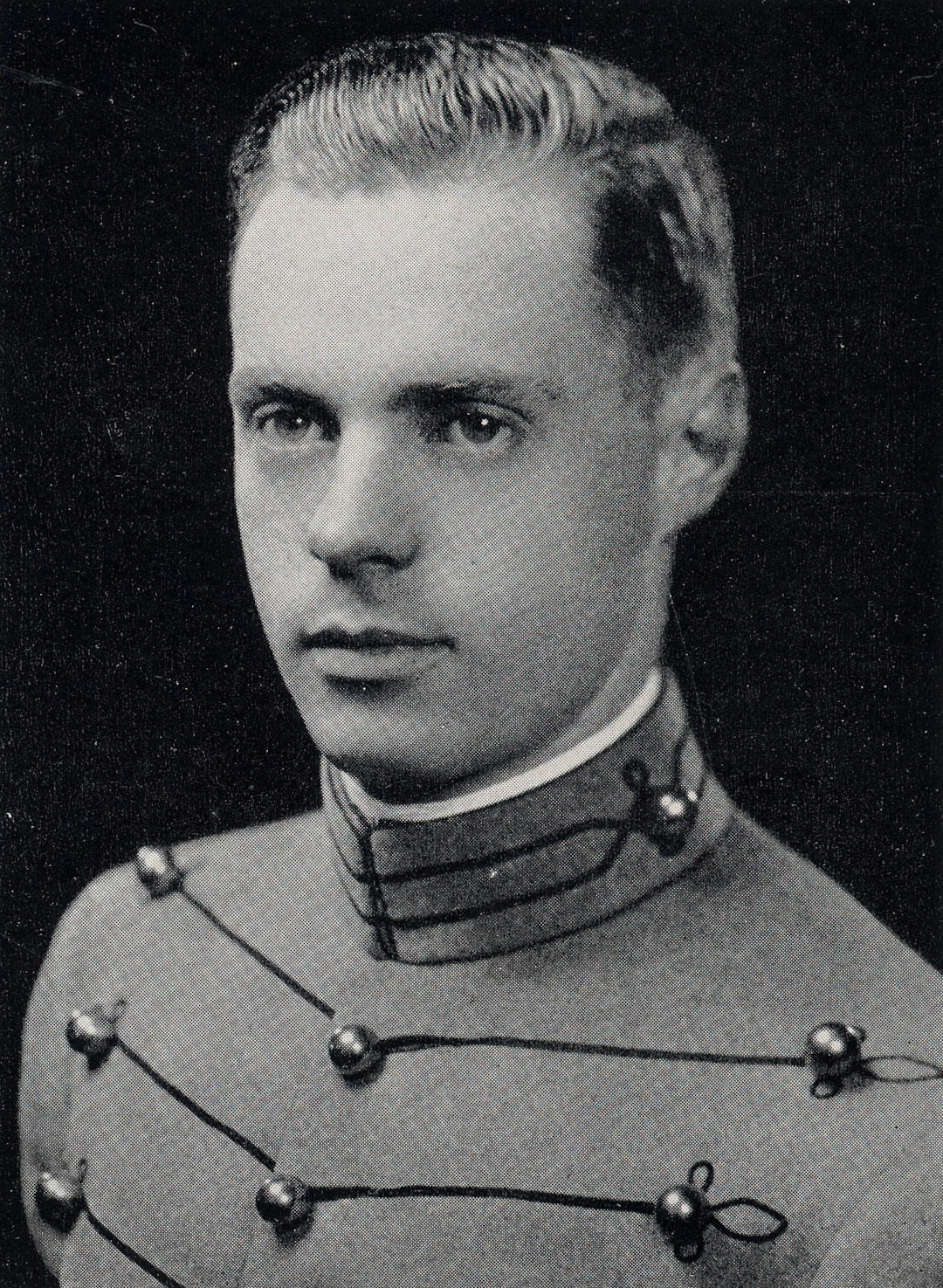
Richardson as a West Point cadet in 1939

Richardson was born in Rockford, Illinois, the son of (future) General Robert C. Richardson Jr. In 1932, he attended the Gunnery School in Washington, Connecticut, and in 1933, entered Valley Forge Military Academy in Wayne, Pennsylvania, graduating in 1935. He received a congressional appointment from Pennsylvania to the United States Military Academy and graduated in June 1939. He joined the expanding US Army Air Forces attending pilot training schools in Tulsa, Oklahoma, Randolph and Kelly fields, Texas, graduating in June 1940. In July 1940, he was assigned as a flight instructor at Randolph Field flying AT-6 Texan and AT-7 Navigator training aircraft and subsequently in the advanced twin-engine school at Barksdale Field, flying Martin B-10 bombers. In September 1941, he was transferred to the 52nd Fighter Group, Selfridge Field, served as squadron commander and group operations officer flying P-40 Warhawk pursuit aircraft, and went with the Group to Norfolk, Virginia, and Florence, South Carolina.

== On Ascension Island ==
In April 1942, he took command of the 1st Composite Squadron, a unit of 18 P-39 Airacobras pursuit aircraft and five B-25 Mitchell bombers being organized at Key Field, Meridian, Mississippi. He deployed, in August 1942, to the newly constructed and secret Wideawake Airfield on Ascension Island in the South Atlantic Ocean. Their function was to patrol the sea around the island, to detect and destroy any enemy submarines and surface raiders, and to protect Allied ships in the vicinity of the island. Wideawake Airfield was a key refueling base on the only air resupply route in 1942–1943 connecting the United States to the Allied Western Desert Campaign raging in North Africa and the Soviet forces through the Persian Gulf and the Caucuses.

The air route stretched from Florida and Texas across the Caribbean region, down the South American east coast to Natal and Recife Brazil, across the South Atlantic through Ascension Island to the British and Belgian colonies in West Africa, across the bottom of the Sahara Desert to Khartoum Sudan, and up the Nile to Egypt and Allied forces in the Middle East and beyond. This was the only way to get large-to-medium aircraft and urgent military supplies to the British Middle East Command in Egypt (for which the U.S. Ninth Air Force was providing air support) in the Allied 1943 Egypt–Libya Campaign leading up to the defeat of Rommel and securing North Africa following Operation Torch and the Tunisia Campaign in late 1943.

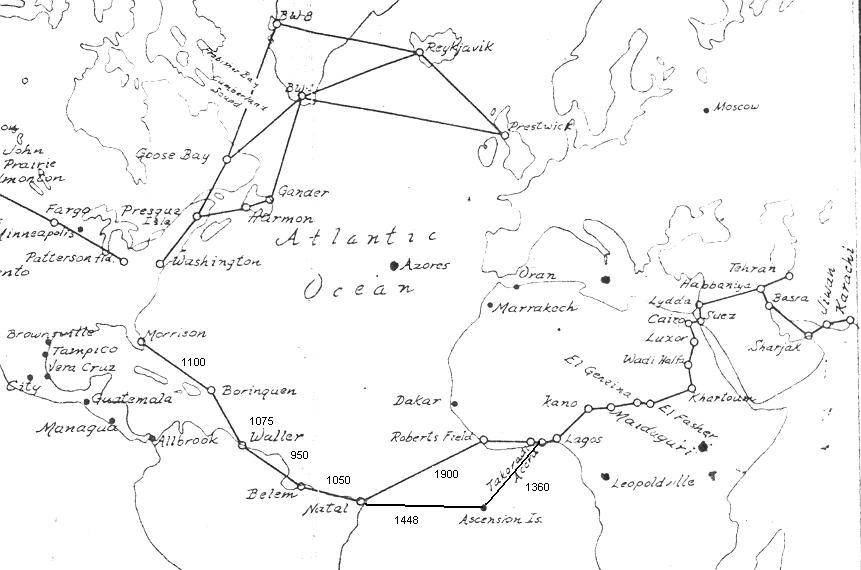
Principal Atlantic air transport and ferrying routes, 1943

== Laconia incident ==
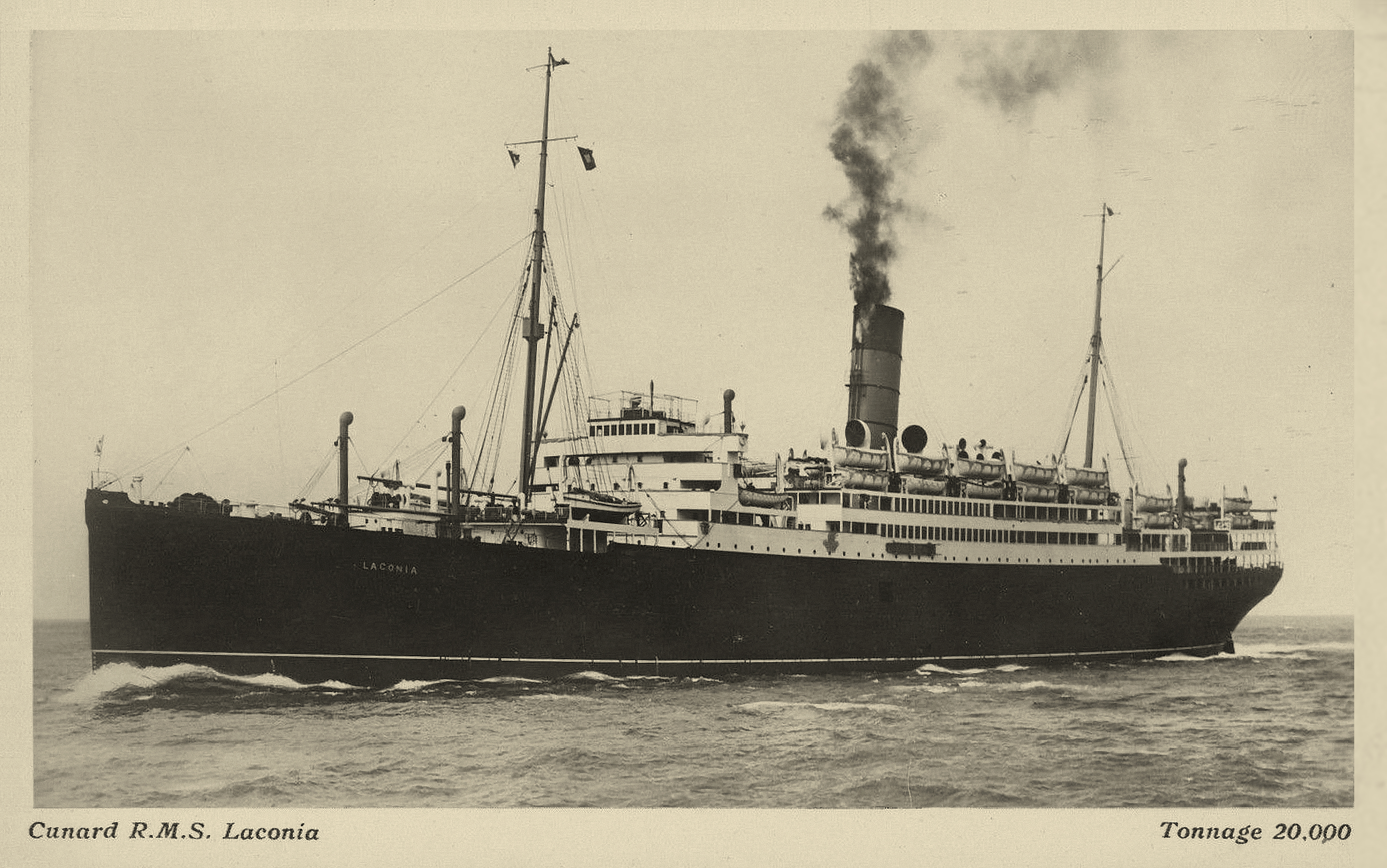
RMS Laconia

On early 15 September 1942, while senior operations officer at Ascension, Captain Richardson was notified by the island's British liaison that RMS Laconia had been torpedoed. Later that morning a transiting A-20 reported sighting and taking fire from two German U-boats. Two dispatched B-25 bombers found neither the submarines nor Laconia. Later that night at about 10 p.m., Richardson was asked to assist in rescue efforts by providing air cover for the en route merchant ships, the nearby Empire Haven and HMS Corinthian at Takoorida. The next day a transiting B-24D Liberator from the 343rd Bombardment Squadron was sent to investigate and found four U-boats displaying the Red Cross flag engaged in rescue operations from the sinking of Laconia.

U-boat U-156 commander, Lieutenant Commander Werner Hartenstein, had secured permission to conduct rescue operations after discovering that the ship he had just torpedoed, RMS Laconia, carried 1,800 Italian prisoners, a few hundred British and Polish soldiers, plus some number of civilians including women and children, British dependents from Egypt. U-156 was crammed above and below decks with nearly two hundred survivors, including five women, and had another 200 in tow aboard four lifeboats. On 16 September at 11:25 a.m., U-156 was spotted by an American B-24 Liberator bomber flying from a secret airbase on Ascension Island. The submarine was travelling with a Red Cross flag draped across her gun deck. Hartenstein signalled to the pilot in both Morse code and English requesting assistance. A British RAF officer also messaged the aircraft: "Laconia survivors on board, soldiers, civilians, women, children"

Lieutenant James D. Harden of the US Army Air Forces did not respond to the messages, and turned away and notified his base of the situation. The senior officer on duty that day, Captain Robert C. Richardson III, who claimed later that he did not know that this was a Red Cross-sanctioned German rescue operation, ordered the B-24 to "sink the sub". The patrolling bomber loaded with depth charges and bombs reported that the submarine had a white flag with a red cross and they had unsuccessfully challenged the submarine via radio to display its national flag. The submarine blinked via signal light what the bomber crew understood to read "German Sir". The bomber crew asked Ascension Island what to do next.

This action became known as the "Laconia incident", and led Grossadmiral Karl Dönitz, chief of German Submarine Operations, to issue the "Laconia Order" to his U-boat commanders that stated in part "No attempt of any kind must be made at rescuing members of ships sunk ..." At the end of the war, the Laconia Order was unsuccessfully used against Admiral Dönitz in his war crime trial, because Fleet Admiral Chester W. Nimitz testified that in the war with Japan the US Navy had followed the same general policy as was set forth in the German admiral's directive. The Laconia Incident showed how a small tactical decision can have strategic impact across history.

== Back to the United States and on to Europe ==
While on Ascension Island, then-Major Richardson boasted, over drinks, to a visiting Air Staff team that he could successfully ferry a group of P-38 Lightnings via the South Atlantic air route. In March 1943, Richardson was ordered back to the United States as the project officer and flight leader to make good his boast that he could ferry P-38 Lightnings to North Africa via the South Atlantic. In April 1943, he successfully delivered 52 of the original 53 aircraft to Morocco to reinforce US air forces supporting Operation TORCH. From there he was assigned back to the United States as chief of the Aircraft Division, and later as chief of the Fighter Division, Army Air Force Board, Orlando, Florida where he had the opportunity to test fly a number of the experimental aircraft to include the XP-59A, Airacomet, the first US jet fighter, then undergoing testing at Muroc Army Air Field.

In July 1944, he was reassigned to the Operations Division, Headquarters US Strategic Air Force in Europe. He spent the first month touring European fighter units briefing them on what he learned from flying the XP-59A, Airacomet, and on suggested tactics to use against the new German jet aircraft. He then served as an action officer in General Carl Spaatz's headquarters in London and Paris through December 1944 where he coordinated what new equipment and weapons coming from the CONUS based Army Force Board with what the European combat units said they needed and experienced. In January 1945, he transferred to the Operations Division of Headquarters, IX Tactical Air Command, Ninth Air Force. In April 1945, he assumed command of the 365th Fighter Group, "The Hell Hawks," at Fritzlar, Germany. He led the unit in their support of the General Patton's final push into Germany then transitioned the P-47 Thunderbolt fighter group from wartime to peacetime operations. Upon the redeployment of the 365th Fighter Group back to the United States in September 1945, he remained in the Occupation Forces as chief of the Aircraft Allocation Division, Headquarters, US Air Forces in Europe. In February 1946, he became assistant chief of staff for operations, European Air Transport Service where it was his task to round up, account for, and dispose of all the US aircraft in the European Theater as the US Army Air Forces rapidly demobilized and sent units back to the United States.

== Evolving into a strategic long-range planner ==
In June 1946, then-Lieutenant Colonel Richardson was assigned to the War Plans Division of the Air Staff in Washington, D.C. In July 1947, he was transferred to the Joint War Plans Committee, which in December 1947, upon implementation of the 1947 Unification Act, became Joint Strategic Plans Group, Joint Chiefs of Staff. Upon creation of the North Atlantic Treaty Organisation in 1949, newly promoted Colonel Richardson became the first Air Force planner on the NATO Standing Group.

== NATO years ==
As one of the original NATO war planners, he prepared the European Theater war plans on how to counter a potential Cold War invasion by the overwhelming Soviet land forces that outnumbered US and NATO conventional forces by a factor of 10-to-1. He worked the negotiation of an agreement for Germany's rearmament and for the establishment of the Supreme Headquarters Allied Powers in Europe (SHAPE) in Paris, France. In February 1951, Richardson accompanied General Lauris Norstad to Europe as a member of his planning staff. In July 1951, he was designated as the US Joint Chiefs of Staff representative and military observer to the European Defense Community Treaty Conference in Paris. In July 1953, he was assigned to the Plans Staff of the Air Deputy, SHAPE, when responsibility for US military advice to the European Defense Community was transferred from the US Ambassador to the Supreme Allied Commander in Europe. From July 1953 to July 1955, Richardson was special assistant to Air Vice-Marshal Edmund Hudleston, Royal Air Force, Deputy Chief of Staff/Operations SHAPE, and later, the deputy director/policy, Headquarters SHAPE, serving primarily as the US Air Force member of the Inter-Allied Planning Committee (New Approach Group) that developed the concept for an atomic defense of Europe. In that capacity he wrote the original NATO atomic or nuclear war plans and became one of the US military's leading authorities on tactical nuclear warfare, strategy, and concepts.

In July 1955, Richardson returned to the United States to attend the National War College, graduating in June 1956. He assumed command of the 83rd Fighter Wing (redesignated 4th Fighter Wing) flying F-86H Sabre and re-opened Seymour Johnson Air Force Base, North Carolina.

== Atomic weapons and the evolution of theater nuclear warfare ==
From his experience thinking of and drafting NATO's nuclear war plans under President Eisenhower's emphasis on atomic defense to counter Soviet conventional superiority led him in 1955 to publish a series of articles on nuclear and atomic warfare in the Air University Review. As a result, Richardson had become an acknowledged military expert in nuclear warfare and a regular lecturer on the subject at the National Defense College and Air War College. In January 1958, he was transferred to Headquarters US Air Force, to become assistant for Long Range Objectives to the deputy chief of staff/plans and programs. He was promoted to brigadier general in May 1960.

With the installation of the new Kennedy Administration, Secretary of Defense, Robert McNamara directed the dismantlement of the Air Force and Navy long range plans staffs and ordered the services' long range planning experts out of Washington and into the field. This along with imposing a more restrictive editorial policy on the military services' strategy journals removed the services' key thinkers from the Washington debates arising from the administration's new strategic direction with regard to military procurement and military strategy development. As a result, in June 1961, Richardson was transferred to the Military Assistance Division, Headquarters US European Command, Paris, France, and upon arrival was detailed by General Norstad as director of operations for Live Oak, the Tripartite Berlin Plans and Operations Group air force team that coordinated and executed the NATO air responses to the Soviet attempts close down the Berlin air corridors during the Berlin Crisis. Upon termination of the Berlin Crisis, Richardson was assigned as deputy standing group representative, NATO, effective 1 January 1962 through 1 January 1964.

== Air Force System Command and strategic acquisition development ==
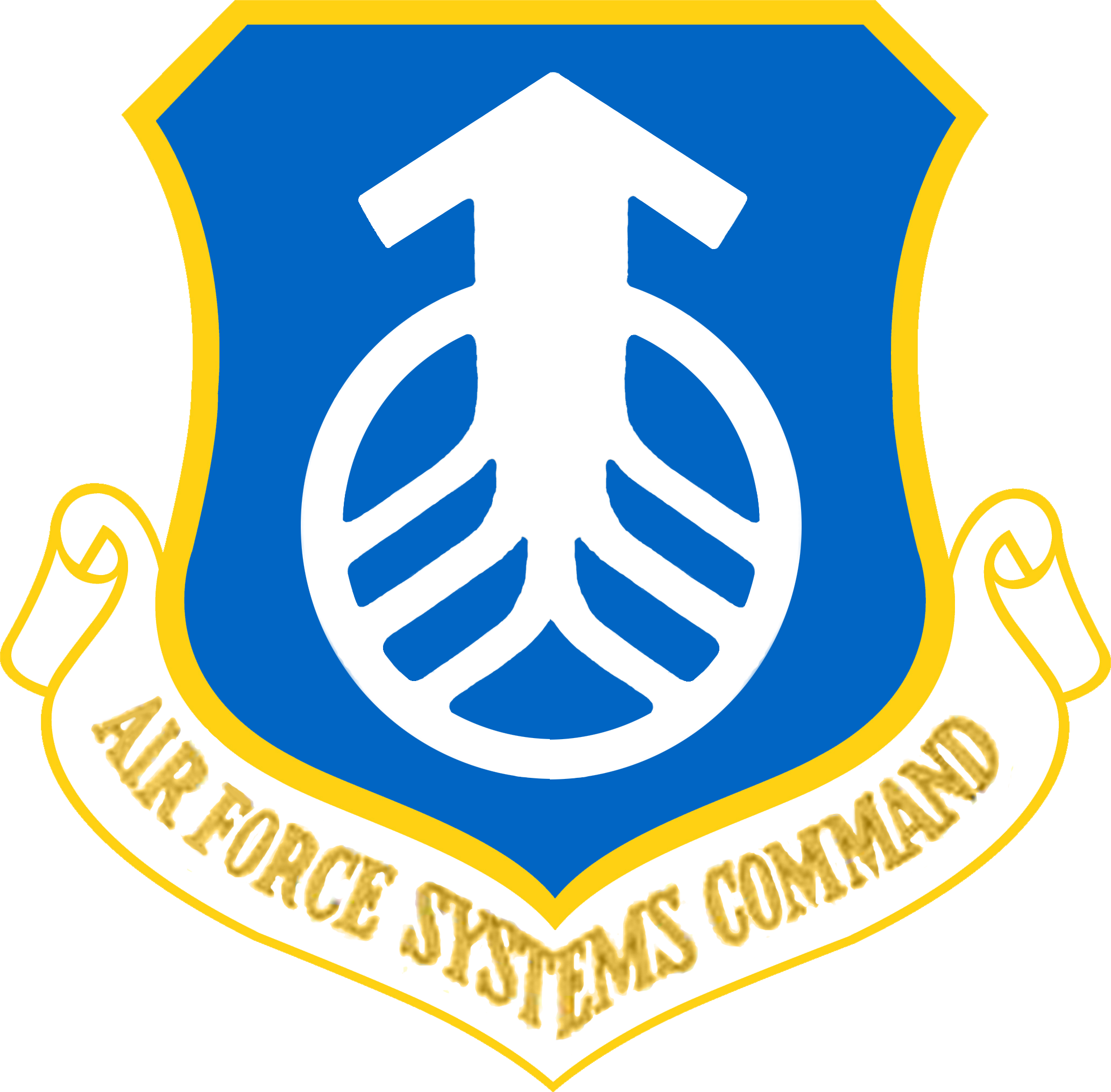
AFSC Logo

Given Secretary of Defense McNamara's known hostility toward any military service long-range planning and to Richardson's strategic thinking, the Air Force assigned Richardson to Headquarters Air Force Systems Command, Andrews Air Force Base, Maryland. He served as assistant to the commander, then assistant deputy chief of staff for plans, and in August 1965, he was assigned as the deputy chief of staff for science and technology. On 31 July 1966, he reported to Field Command, Defense Atomic Support Agency.

His final military assignment was to Headquarters Field Command, Defense Atomic Support Agency, Sandia Base, New Mexico, as deputy commander for weapons and training where he was responsible for managing atomic weapon development and training activities and the nuclear weapons stockpile.

== Defense policy consultant and learning to influence public policy ==
Richardson retired from active duty on 1 August 1967 and began his second career as a writer, lecturer, and consultant on defense issues, nuclear strategy, and aerospace technology management. He joined his long-time friend and former AFSC commander, General Bernard Adolph Schriever, as a senior associate with Schriever & McKee Associate Consultants to bring his aerospace and systems management expertise to bear on the issues facing urban America.

In the 1970s, Richardson greatly expanded his work as an author, lecturer, and policy advocate in the areas of national security, defense theory, defense policy formulation, nuclear strategy, defense technology acquisition, and long range planning. During this decade, he actively advocated conservative viewpoints regarding defense and national security public policy issues serving as:

- consultant to American Enterprise Institute
- assistant editor for Journal of International Security
- member of the American Security Council
- executive director, American Foreign Policy Institute
- secretary-treasurer for Security and Intelligence Fund
- co-chairman of the Coalition for Peace Through Defense

As recognized authority on tactical nuclear warfare and defense technology acquisition, he also served as consultant to Los Alamos National Laboratory (1971–1979), US and European aerospace industries, and Stanford Research Institute.

== High frontier and the space-based missile defense ==
Strategic Defense Initiative logo

In 1981, Richardson teamed up with Lieutenant General Daniel O. Graham on a Heritage Foundation project called High Frontier to formulate a long-term national strategy and plan to build a US space-based missile defense. This plan was the foundation for President Ronald Reagan's Strategic Defense Initiative. Richardson went on to serve as deputy directory for the High Frontier non-profit organization from 1981 to 2003 that not only advocated the maximum use of US space technology for missile defense but also for the industrial and commercial use of space. Over the two decades he was with High Frontier, Richardson successfully advocated for President Ronald Reagan's Strategic Defense Initiative, established the Space Transportation Association, advocated the single-stage-to-orbit (or SSTO) vehicle as a follow-on to the Space Shuttle, and more recently, helped develop a long-term strategy to colonize the Moon.

== Notable publications ==
- "Atomic Weapons and War Damage," ORBIS, spring 1960;
- "Do We Need Unlimited Forces for Limited War," Air Force Magazine, March 1959;
- "Forces in Being – The Weapons," Air Force Magazine, August 1958;
- "In The Looking Glass," Air University Review, winter 1957–1958;
- "Nuclear Stalemate Fallacy," Air Force Magazine, August 1956;
- "Atomic Weapons and Theater Warfare" (four articles) Air University Review, winter and spring 1955;
- "The US Air Force and NATO," Air University Review, winter 1952–1953;
- "Defense on the Technological Front," Air Force Magazine, June 1966.

== Awards and decorations ==
Richardson's decorations include the

- Legion of Merit with two oak leaf clusters
- Air Medal
- Army Commendation Medal
- French Croix de Guerre with silver star.

== Personal ==
Richardson and his wife Anne Waln (Taylor) Richardson lived in Alexandria, Virginia. They had three children and six grandchildren. He contracted Alzheimer's disease and died at his home. Richardson and his wife were interred at the West Point Cemetery.
