= McDonnell Douglas DC-X =

Prototype single-stage-to-orbit rocket developed & flown between 1991-1996

DC-X
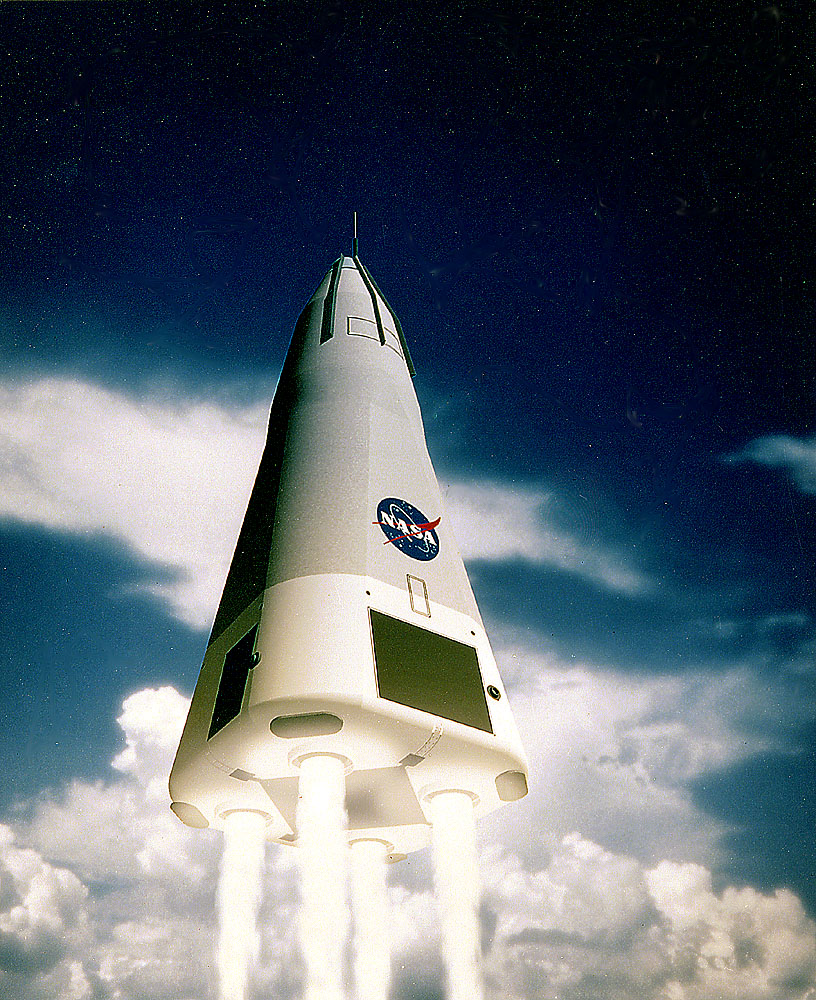
- McDonnell Douglas DC-XA Reusable Launch Vehicle (RLV) concept
- Function: Prototype SSTO vehicle
- Manufacturer: McDonnell Douglas (Huntington Beach, California)
- Country of origin: United States
- Project cost: $60 million (1991)

Size
- Height: 12 metres (39 ft)
- Diameter: 4.1 metres (13 ft)
- Mass: 18,900 kilograms (41,700 lb)
- Stages: 1

Launch history
- Status: Retired
- Launch sites: White Sands Missile Range
- Total launches: 12
- Success(es): 8
- Failure: 1
- Partial failure: 3
- First flight: 18 August 1993
- Last flight: 31 July 1996

First stage
- Diameter: 4.1 metres (13 ft)
- Empty mass: 9,100 kilograms (20,100 lb)
- Gross mass: 18,900 kilograms (41,700 lb)
- Powered by: Four RL10A-5 liquid-fueled rocket engines four gaseous oxygen/gaseous hydrogen thrusters
- Maximum thrust: Main rockets, 60 kN (13,000 lb_{f}); Thrusters, 2.0 kN (440 lbf)
- Propellant: Liquid oxygen and liquid hydrogen

The DC-X, short for Delta Clipper or Delta Clipper Experimental, was an uncrewed prototype of a reusable single-stage-to-orbit launch vehicle built by McDonnell Douglas in conjunction with the United States Department of Defense's Strategic Defense Initiative Organization (SDIO) from 1991 to 1993. Starting 1994 until 1995, testing continued through funding of the US civil space agency NASA. In 1996, the DC-X technology was completely transferred to NASA, which upgraded the design for improved performance to create the DC-XA. After a test flight of DC-XA in 1996 resulted in a fire, the project was canceled. Despite its cancellation, the program inspired later reusable launch systems. Michael D. Griffin has since praised the program as "government R&D at its finest."

Blue Origin's New Shepard and SpaceX's Falcon 9 reusable launch vehicles were inspired by the DC-X, with many of the same engineers involved. Elon Musk has noted his program was "just continuing the great work of the DC-X project."

== Background ==
According to writer Jerry Pournelle: "DC-X was conceived in my living room and sold to National Space Council Chairman Dan Quayle by General Graham, Max Hunter and me." According to Max Hunter, however, he had tried hard to convince Lockheed Martin of the concept's value for several years before he retired. Hunter had written a paper in 1985 entitled "The Opportunity", detailing the concept of a Single-Stage-To-Orbit spacecraft built with low-cost "off-the-shelf" commercial parts and then available technology, but Lockheed Martin was not interested enough to fund such a program themselves.

On February 15, 1989, Pournelle, Graham and Hunter were able to procure a meeting with Vice-President Dan Quayle. They successfully "sold" the idea to SDIO by noting that any space-based weapons system would need to be serviced by a spacecraft that was far more reliable than the Space Shuttle, and offer lower launch costs and have much better turnaround times.

Given the uncertainties of the design, the basic plan was to produce a deliberately simple test vehicle and to "fly a little, break a little" in order to gain experience with fully reusable quick-turnaround spacecraft. As experience was gained with the vehicle, a larger prototype would be built first for sub-orbital and then orbital tests. Finally a commercially acceptable vehicle would be developed from these prototypes. In keeping with general aircraft terminology, they proposed the small prototype should be called the DC-X, X being the US Air Force designation for "experimental". This would be followed by the "DC-Y", with Y being the USAF designation for pre-production test aircraft and prototypes (e.g. YF-16). Finally the production version would be known as the "DC-1". The name "Delta Clipper" was chosen to result in the acronym "DC" to draw a connection with the Douglas "DC Series" of airliners, beginning with the Douglas DC-1.

The vehicle is inspired by the designs of McDonnell Douglas engineer Philip Bono, who saw single stage to orbit VTOL lifters as the future of space travel. The Delta Clipper was very similar to Bono's SASSTO vehicle from 1967. Bono died less than three months before the DC-X's first test flight.

== SDIO requirement ==
SDIO wanted a "suborbital, recoverable rocket (SRR) capable of lifting up to 3,000 pounds (1361 kg) of payload to an altitude of 1.5 million feet (457 km); returning to the launch site for a precise soft landing; with the capability to launch for another mission within three to seven days".

== Specification ==
DC-X Specifications:

- 12 m high, 4.1 m diameter at base, conical shape
- Empty mass: 9100 kg. Fueled mass: With full load of propellants:18,900 kg
- Propellants: Liquid oxygen and liquid hydrogen
- Propulsion: Four RL10A-5 rocket engines, each generating 6,100 kgf thrust. Each engine throttleable from 30% to 100%. Each gimbals +/-8 degrees.
- Reaction Controls: Four 440-lb thrust gaseous oxygen, gaseous hydrogen thrusters
- Guidance, Navigation and Control Avionics: Advanced 32 bit, 4.5 mips computer, F-15 Navigation System with ring laser gyros. F/A-18 accelerometer and rate gyro package. Global Positioning Satellite P(Y) code receiver. Digital data telemetry system. Radar altimeter.
- Hydraulic System: Standard hydraulic aircraft-type system to drive vehicle's five aerodynamic flaps and eight engine gimbal actuators (two per engine).
- Construction Materials: Aeroshell and base heat shield: graphite epoxy composite with special silicon-based thermal protection coating; Main propellant tanks: 2219 alloy aluminium; Main structural supports: aluminum; Landing gear: steel and titanium

== Design ==
Built as a one-third-size scale prototype, the DC-X was never designed to achieve orbital altitudes or velocity, but instead to demonstrate the concept of vertical take off and landing. The vertical take off and landing concept was popular in science fiction films from the 1950s (Rocketship X-M, Destination Moon, and others), but not seen in real world designs of space vehicles. It would take off vertically like standard rockets, but also land vertically with the nose up. This design used attitude control thrusters and retro rockets to control the descent, allowing the craft to begin atmospheric entry nose-first, but then roll around and touch down on landing struts at its base. The craft could be refueled where it landed, and take off again from exactly the same position — a trait that allowed unprecedented turnaround times.

In theory a base-first re-entry profile would be easier to arrange. The base of the craft would already need some level of heat protection to survive the engine exhaust, so adding more protection would be easy enough. More importantly, the base of the craft is much larger than the nose area, leading to lower peak temperatures as the heat load is spread out over a larger area. Finally, this profile would not require the spacecraft to "flip around" for landing.

The military role made this infeasible, however. One desired safety requirement for any spacecraft is the ability to "abort once around", that is, to return for a landing after a single orbit. Since a typical low Earth orbit takes about 90 to 120 minutes, the Earth will rotate to the east about 20 to 30 degrees in that time; or for a launch from the southern United States, about 1,500 miles (2,400 km). If the spacecraft is launched to the east this does not present a problem, but for the polar orbits required of military spacecraft, when the orbit is complete the spacecraft overflies a point far to the west of the launch site. In order to land back at the launch site, the craft needs to have considerable cross-range maneuverability, something that is difficult to arrange with a large smooth surface. The Delta Clipper design thus used a nose-first re-entry with flat sides on the fuselage and large control flaps to provide the needed cross range capability. Experiments with the control of such a re-entry profile had never been tried, and were a major focus of the project.

Another focus of the DC-X project was minimized maintenance and ground support. To this end, the craft was highly automated and required only three people in its control center (two for flight operations and one for ground support).

== Flight testing ==
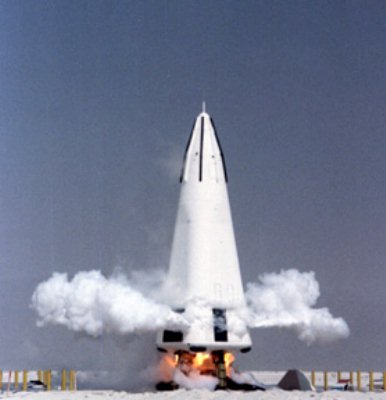
The Delta Clipper Advanced

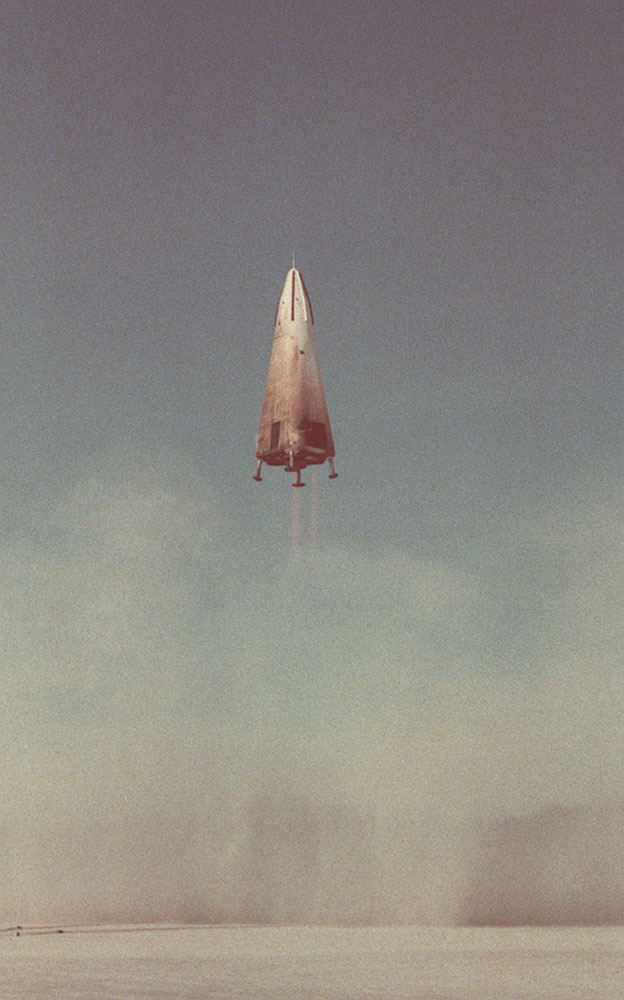
First flight

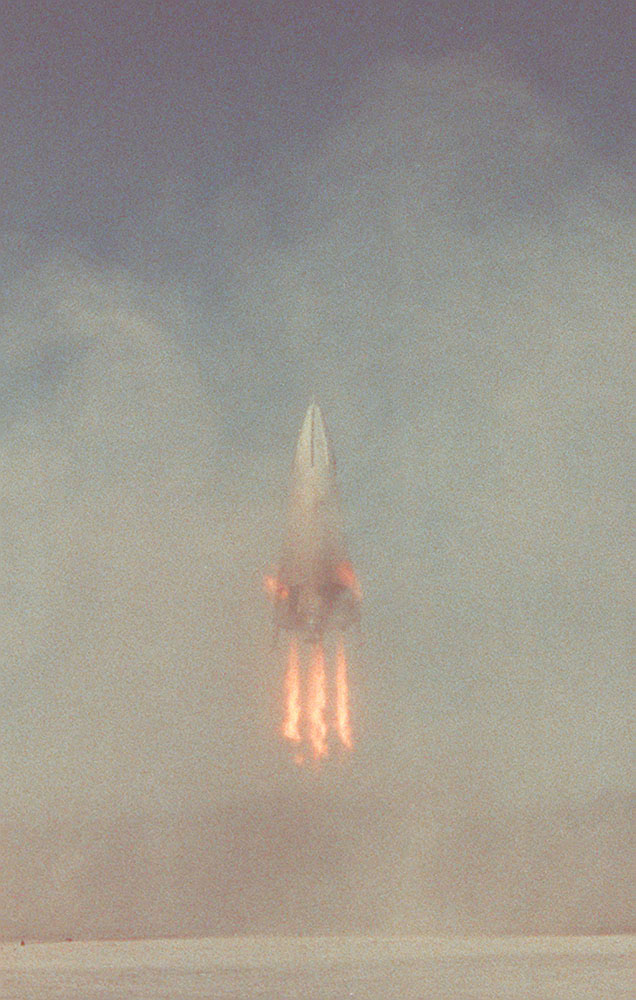
First landing. The yellow exhaust is due to the low throttle settings, which burns at lower temperatures and is generally "dirty" as a result.

Construction of the DC-X started in 1991 at McDonnell Douglas' Huntington Beach facility. The aeroshell was custom-constructed by Scaled Composites, but the majority of the spacecraft was built from commercial off-the-shelf parts, including the engines and flight control systems.

The DC-X first flew, for 59 seconds, on 18 August 1993; it was claimed that it was the first time a rocket had landed vertically on Earth. It flew two more flights 11 September and 30 September, when funding ran out as a side effect of the winding down of the SDIO program; in addition the program was considered far-fetched by detractors. Apollo astronaut Pete Conrad was at the ground-based controls for some flights. These tests were conducted at the White Sands Missile Range in New Mexico.

However, further funding was provided by NASA and the Advanced Research Projects Agency (ARPA). The test program restarted on 20 June 1994 with a 136-second flight. The next flight, 27 June 1994, suffered a minor inflight explosion, but the craft successfully executed an abort and autoland. Testing restarted after this damage was fixed, and three more flights were carried out on 16 May 1995, 12 June, and 7 July. On the last flight a hard landing cracked the aeroshell. By this point funding for the program had already been cut, and there were no funds for the needed repairs. The altitude record for the DC-X was 2,500 m, set during its last flight before being upgrading to the DC-XA, on 7 July 1995.

=== DC-XA ===
NASA agreed to take on the program after the last DC-X flight in 1995. In contrast to the original concept of the DC-X demonstrator, NASA applied a series of major upgrades to test new technologies. In particular, the oxygen tank was replaced by a lightweight (alloy 1460 equivalent of alloy 2219) aluminium-lithium alloy tank from Russia, and the hydrogen tank by a graphite-epoxy composite design. The control system was likewise improved. The upgraded vehicle was called the DC-XA, renamed the Clipper Advanced/Clipper Graham, and resumed flight in 1996.

The first flight of the DC-XA test vehicle was made on 18 May 1996 and resulted in a minor fire when the deliberate "slow landing" resulted in overheating of the aeroshell. The damage was quickly repaired and the vehicle flew two more times on 7 and 8 June, a 26-hour turnaround. On the second of these flights the vehicle set its altitude and duration records, 3,140 metres (10,300 ft) and 142 seconds of flight time. Also, during the 8 June flight, the vehicle executed the first planned rotation maneuver for a rocket, where it transitioned from nose first forward flight to controlled backwards flight. At the apex of this rotation maneuver, DC-XA slowed itself by rotating to a backwards orientation, and flew backwards, base first, with its nose 10 degrees below the horizon, under control of the main engines. It then exercised a controlled rotation to a nose up attitude, and executed a powered soft landing. This maneuver showed that a single stage to orbit vehicle could efficiently return from orbit using aerodynamic braking in a forward attitude, and then rotate to a base first powered landing at a spaceport.

Its next flight, on 31 July 1996, proved to be its last. The launch and flight portion of this mission was flawless, however, after slowing to a perfect touchdown, only 3 of the 4 landing struts extended. The vehicle could not balance on 3 struts, and slowly fell sideways on the landing pad. When the side of the vehicle struck the concrete pad, the main liquid oxygen tank cracked open and leaked LOX onto the pad. This LOX contacted a small amount of glowing material on the base heat shield, and started a fire. Post flight inspection of the landing struts revealed that the pneumatic nitrogen actuation line to the failed strut was disconnected. This line was normally disconnected from the strut during pre-flight testing, when each strut was extended and retracted by a ground cart. Normally the structural damage from such a fall would constitute only a setback, but the LOX from the leaking tank fed a fire which severely burned the DC-XA, causing such extensive damage that repairs were impractical.

In a post-accident report, NASA's Brand Commission blamed the accident on a burnt-out field crew who had been operating under on-again/off-again funding and constant threats of outright cancellation. The crew, many of them originally from the SDIO program, were also highly critical of NASA's "chilling" effect on the program, and the masses of paperwork NASA demanded as part of the testing regimen.

NASA had taken on the project grudgingly after having been "shamed" by its very public success under the direction of the SDIO. Its continued success was cause for considerable political in-fighting within NASA due to it competing with their "home grown" Lockheed Martin X-33/VentureStar project. Pete Conrad priced a new DC-X at $50 million, cheap by NASA standards, but NASA decided not to rebuild the craft in light of budget constraints. Instead, NASA focused development on the Lockheed Martin VentureStar which it felt answered some criticisms of the DC-X, specifically the airplane-like landing of the VentureStar, which many NASA engineers preferred over the vertical landing of the DC-X. Just a few years later, the repeated failure of the Venturestar project, especially the composite LH2 (liquid hydrogen) tank, led to program cancellation.

== Program cost ==
The original DC-X was built in 21 months for a cost of $60 million. This is equivalent to $127 million in present-day terms.

== Legacy ==
Several engineers who worked on the DC-X were hired by Blue Origin, and their New Shepard vehicle was inspired by the DC-X design. The DC-X provided inspiration for many elements of Armadillo Aerospace's, Masten Space Systems's, and TGV Rockets's spacecraft designs. Elon Musk stated that the SpaceX Falcon 9 development was "... continuing the great work of the DC-X project."

Some NASA engineers have noted that the DC-X could provide a solution for a crewed Mars lander. Had a DC-type craft been developed that operated as an SSTO in Earth's gravity well, even if with only a minimum 4–6 crew capacity, variants of it might prove extremely capable for both Mars and Moon missions. Such a variant's basic operation would have to be "reversed"; from taking off and then landing, to landing first then taking off. Yet, if this could be accomplished on Earth, the weaker gravity found at both Mars and the Moon would make for dramatically greater payload capabilities, particularly at the latter destination.

Some people proposed design changes include using an oxidizer/fuel combination that does not require the relatively extensive ground support required for the liquid hydrogen and liquid oxygen that DC-X utilized, and adding a fifth leg for increased stability during and after landing.

== See also ==
- Lockheed Martin X-33 – Uncrewed re-usable spaceplane technology demonstrator for the VentureStar
- Blue Origin New Shepard – Rocket developed by Blue Origin
- Quad (rocket) – VTVL technology demonstrator
- Zarya – Soviet orbital vehicle design
- SpaceX reusable launch system development program
- CORONA – Russian prototype reusable single-stage-to-orbit launch vehicle
- Project Morpheus – NASA vertical landing and takeoff test vehicle to continue developing ALHAT and Quad landers
- Reusable Vehicle Testing – Japanese reusable rocket testing project
- Kankoh-maru – Japanese orbital vehicle design
