= CORONA (rocket) =

Russian prototype reusable single-stage-to-orbit launch vehicle

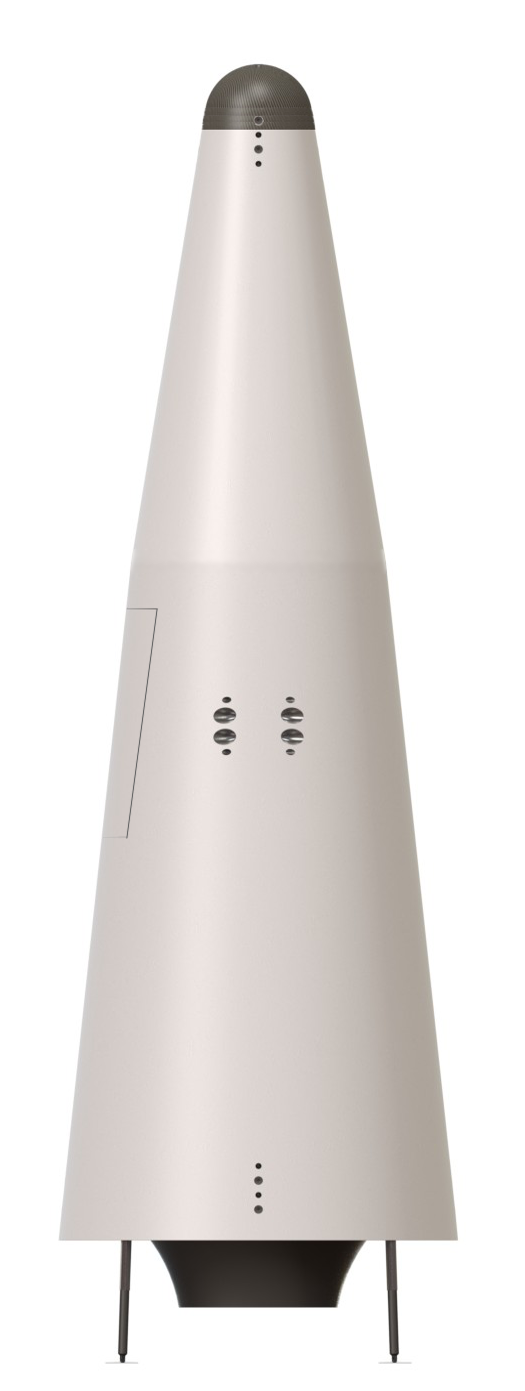
- CORONA (RLV) concept
- Function: Reusable launch vehicle
- Manufacturer: Makeyev Rocket Design Bureau
- Country of origin: Russia

Size
- Height: 30 m (98 ft)
- Diameter: 10 m (33 ft)
- Mass: 280–290 t (620,000–640,000 lb)
- Stages: 1

Capacity

Payload to LEO
- Altitude: 200–500 km (120–310 mi)
- Mass: 7–12 tonnes (15,000–26,000 lb)

Launch history
- Status: Under development

Single stage
- Propellant: LOX/LH_{2}

CORONA is a single-stage-to-orbit launch vehicle capable of performing vertical takeoff and landing. It was developed by OAO GRTs Makeyev from 1992 to 2012. However, the development was declined due to lack of funding. In 2016, the company announced plans to resume the development of the CORONA vehicle.

== Overview ==
CORONA is intended for launching payloads to low Earth orbit with an altitude of 200–500 km (120–310 mi). It has a launch mass of 280–290 tonnes (620,000–640,000 lb) and is intended for launching payloads weighing up to 7 tonnes (15,000 lb) with traditional use or up to 12 tonnes (26,000 lb) with a special scheme for launching into low Earth orbit. However, the payload capacity goes down to 6 tonnes (13,000 lb) and up to 11 tonnes (24,000 lb) respectively when launching from Russia. With the use of reusable boosters that form a launch complex with it, the launch vehicle provides launching into orbits with an inclination of up to 110° up to altitudes of 10,000 km (6,200 mi) and returning from them if necessary.

== See also ==
- Blue Origin New Shepard
- Kankoh-maru
- Lockheed Martin X-33
- McDonnell Douglas DC-X
- Project Morpheus NASA program to continue developing ALHAT and Quad landers
- Quad (rocket)
- Reusable Vehicle Testing
- SpaceX reusable launch system development program
- Zarya
