= Starswarm =

1998 science fiction novel by Jerry Pournelle

This is about the novel by Jerry Pournelle. For the story collection of the same title, see Brian Aldiss.

First edition (publ. Tor Books) Cover art by Vincent Di Fate

Starswarm is a 1998 science fiction novel by Jerry Pournelle. The plot revolves around a teenage boy, Kip, who has grown up on a remote planet used primarily as a research station for its bizarre native life. The boy has been raised by both his "Uncle" Mike and an experimental computer program Gwen, written by his dead mother, (which talks to him through a chip implanted in his brain after birth) that slowly reveals more and more of his important destiny concerning control of the company which owns and controls the planet. Gwen helps him understand the significance of the Starswarms, massive super-intelligent plant-like creatures dwelling in the bottom of the planet's countless shallow lakes and oceans. An obvious theme of the book is expressing the thoughts of computer-like entities, such as Gwen (the computer program) and the native alien neural nets.
