= Janissaries II: Clan and Crown =

1982 novel by Roland J. Green

Janissaries: Clan and Crown
- First edition
- Author: Jerry Pournelle and Roland J. Green
- Language: English
- Series: Janissaries series
- Genre: Science fiction
- Publisher: Ace Books
- Publication date: November 1st, 1982
- Publication place: United States
- Media type: Print (Paperback)
- Pages: 437
- ISBN: 0-441-38294-0
- OCLC: 9100579
- Preceded by: Janissaries
- Followed by: Janissaries III: Storms of Victory

Janissaries: Clan and Crown is a science fiction novel by American writers Jerry Pournelle and Roland J. Green, the second book of Pournelle's Janissaries series (the first was titled simply Janissaries). It was originally published in 1982 and, like the first book in the series, was illustrated, this time by Josep M. Martin Sauri. In 1996 Janissaries: Clan and Crown appeared in a double novel with the third book in the Janissaries series, Janissaries III: Storms of Victory as Tran.

== Background ==
The book continues the adventures of Captain Rick Galloway's Earth-born mercenaries on the planet Tran as they continue to carve out an area of conquest and necessary alliances with Tran's native human population, in order to serve the alien Shalnuksis. The Shalnuksis are members of a galactic Confederation which uses humans as slave soldiers/administrators (hence the series title "Janissaries"), but they are keeping Tran a secret from the Confederation in order to profit from a drug that can only be grown there.

== Plot ==
By the end of the first book Rick has married Tylara, duchess of the preeminent duchy in Drantos and daughter of the Grand Chief of the Tamaerthan clans, thus securing a political base. He is the military leader of the alliance of both countries and has reunited about half of the mercenaries under his control (the rest had deserted their previous commander and have set up in various city states to the south). The book opens with two more rejoining and bringing with them the valuable recoilless rifle, the last of the heavy weapons not under Rick's control.

At a Grand Council of the two allies, the external threats to the alliance are laid out. To the north, the Five Kingdoms still threatens Drantos. To the south, the climatic changes that Tran is experiencing as a result of the approach of the third star in its trinary system will lead to massive migrations north into Drantos as people flee floods. Rick manages to get them to agree to try to ally with the Roman Empire, currently fighting a civil war which started as a result of Rick's actions in Janissaries, in order to secure the southern border from these migrations.

This pushes some of the Tamaerthan nobility, already upset at the diminishing status of the nobility arising from military and social reforms, to plotting against Rick and the university that he has set up. Tylara learns of this and uses a small group of assassins, which she created originally against the possible need to take over a starship, to kill the leader. Rick and Tylara begin to drift apart as a result of the stresses of her keeping this secret group from him.

Rick's emissary to the two Caesars was rebuffed by Flaminius, leading to an alliance with Marselius. Rick joins Marselius' Romans, largely cataphract cavalry; the threat of the Five Kingdoms to the north means the Drantos army remained at home, leaving Rick the Tamaerthan longbowmen, pikemen and light cavalry, as well as the ballistae, catapults and a dozen of the mercenaries. The Romans are initially unimpressed as, like most of the world of Tran, the Romans value heavy cavalry above all else.

Rick realises that he needs to lead an engagement from the front at least once to dispel talk that he is a coward. Leading a scouting force, he forces a crossing over a vital bridge, allowing the allied army to cross and securing the loyalty of those Tamaerthans who doubted his honour. The Flaminian Romans, who outnumber the allies, plan to draw their enemies forward into a trap to minimise Roman losses on both sides. However, Rick deploys an observation balloon, enabling him to divine the enemy plan; further, he locates the enemy command post and leads a small force to capture it. After showing the enemy commander how his cataphracts are losing to a barbarian infantry force stiffened with mercenaries, Rick convinces him to surrender, leading to the end of the Roman civil war.

The following year the Westmen, a nomadic horse people descended from Scythians and who field high quality horse archers, invade Drantos. The approach of the third star has led to drought on the steppes, forcing the entire Westman nation to move east. The young king of Drantos, Ganton, leads a force composed of Drantos and Roman heavy cavalry, longbowmen, calivermen and some mercenaries with their Earth weapons. Despite the allies launching a surprise night attack, they have seriously underestimated the number of Westmen and become separated into three groups. Ganton leads a charge to defeat the enemy in detail whilst reuniting his forces and carries the day, for which the Romans proclaim him Imperator.

The spaceship that brought the mercenaries to Tran returns with supplies. It also brings a problem, as the human pilot Les had previously left his pregnant girlfriend Gwen on Tran because the Confederation would not have allowed them to keep the child. Not knowing that Les would return, she had married a local lord, Caradoc, a loyal vassal and friend to Rick and Tylara. Les' arrival and insistence on resuming his relationship with Gwen will lead to a crisis; either he will be killed, jeopardising the future of the planet, or he will kill Caradoc, who the feudal system will require Rick to avenge. Tylara again uses her assassins to solve the problem, this time by killing her friend Caradoc.

== Reviews ==
- Ares Magazine #14 (Spring 1983)
