= Maxwell Hunter =

American aerospace engineer

Maxwell White Hunter II (March 11, 1922 – November 10, 2001) was a prominent American aerospace engineer. He worked on the design of the Douglas B-42 and Douglas B-43 bombers, the Honest John, Nike-Ajax, and Nike-Zeus missiles, the Thor IRBM, and on parts of the Strategic Defense Initiative. In later years he worked on space-launch vehicles and was a proponent of Single-stage-to-orbit (SSTO) designs. He was honored in 1995 by the National Space Society for lifelong contributions to the technology of spaceflight.

== Early life and education ==
Maxwell Hunter was born in Hollidaysburg, Pennsylvania and graduated from Washington and Jefferson College in that state with a degree in physics and mathematics. In 1944, he earned a master's degree in aeronautical engineering from the Massachusetts Institute of Technology (MIT).

== Accomplishments in aerospace ==
After earning his MS from MIT, Hunter went to work for the Douglas Aircraft Company. He became their chief designer in aeronautics, working on modifications of the B-42 and B-43 bombers. Later he was promoted to chief engineer for space systems. In this position he oversaw the production of military missiles including the Honest John artillery rocket, the Nike antiaircraft missile, and the Sparrow air-to-air missile.

Douglas Aircraft began work on the Thor, an early Intermediate Range Ballistic Missile (IRBM), in late 1955 and put Hunter in charge of that program. He assembled a small team of crack designers and brought the development to success in a short time. Thor became the basis of the McDonnell Douglas Delta rocket, whose descendants are still boosting payloads into Earth orbit today.

After working for Douglas Aircraft from 1944 to 1961, Hunter joined the staff of the National Aeronautics and Space Council, a group that advised the U.S. president on space policy. Following several years in that position, he went back to the aerospace industry in 1965, spending over two decades with Lockheed Missiles and Space Company (LMSC). (LMSC was a division of Lockheed Corporation, which merged with Martin Marietta in 1995 to become Lockheed-Martin.)

At LMSC, Hunter worked on a variety of projects including parts of the mammoth Strategic Defense Initiative. SDI gave him a chance at realizing a dream he had nurtured since the 1960s: the construction of a Single-stage-to-orbit (SSTO) vehicle. In 1984, Hunter proposed a vehicle he called the X-rocket, based on those earlier SSTO designs. The design was reviewed by LMSC's Astronautics Division (AD), which judged it worth pursuing, and by its Missile Systems Division (MSD), which did not.

LMSC then declined to support further work on the X-rocket, and Hunter retired. As an independent consultant, he renamed the concept SSX (for Space Ship Experimental), and began to refine it. In December 1988 the ad hoc Citizens' Advisory Council on National Space Policy was briefed on the concept by Hunter and others. The general concept was endorsed by the Council and by High Frontier, Inc., a Washington-based group headed by Lt. Gen. Daniel O. Graham that lobbied for SDI programs. Working together, Hunter and High Frontier convinced SDI management and other national officials that a study should be initiated to determine once and for all the feasibility of SSTO vehicles for military missions.

This led to a U.S. Department of Defense (DoD) program to design a single-stage vehicle that could replace military satellites on short notice during a national emergency. This vehicle was known as the Delta Clipper. McDonnell Douglas Corporation was contracted to build and test fly a one-third-scale, suborbital testbed called the DC-X, or Delta Clipper Experimental. While not capable of spaceflight, the DC-X incorporated many of the technologies needed for an SSTO vehicle, including highly automated systems enabling a quick turnaround (just twenty-six hours) between launches. It made eight successful test flights between August 18, 1993, and July 7, 1995, and then was taken over by NASA and flown four times as the DC-XA between May 18 and July 31, 1996. It was damaged on its last flight when one landing strut failed to deploy and the vehicle tipped over at landing. Funding to make repairs and continue flight tests was not made available.

Max Hunter continued to advise on space policy issues and advocate the building of SSTO vehicles for airline-like access to space, a goal he was sure could be attained. He chaired the Rules Committee for the Ansari X Prize, announced in 1996, a $10 million prize for the first reusable craft to reach space twice within two weeks without substantial refit. In October 2000, he agreed to serve as chairman of the advisory board for the Undersea Hotel Project of the Cala Corporation. He died at Stanford Hospital, Stanford, California on the evening of November 10, 2001 after a lingering illness.

== Honors, awards and affiliations ==
Max Hunter was Phi Beta Kappa, Tau Beta Pi, and a Fellow of the American Institute of Aeronautics and Astronautics (AIAA), the American Astronautical Society (AAS), and the British Interplanetary Society (BIS). He was also a member of the International Academy of Astronautics (IAA) and an honorary member of the Japanese Rocket Society. In 1995, he received the Wernher von Braun Memorial Award of the National Space Society for "lifelong contributions to the fields of rockets, missiles and spaceflight." He was also the recipient of a NASA Public Service Medal for "the definition and promotion of the Space Shuttle and its utilization." The Space Frontier Foundation bestowed its 1994 VISION TO REALITY AWARD on Hunter and other key members of the Delta Clipper (DC-X) Team.
