= Janissaries III: Storms of Victory =

1987 novel by Jerry Pournelle and Roland J. Green

- Dust cover of first edition
- Author: Jerry Pournelle and Roland J. Green
- Cover artist: Sanjulián
- Language: English
- Series: Janissaries series
- Genre: Science fiction
- Publisher: Ace Books
- Publication date: April 1, 1987
- Publication place: United States
- Media type: Hardcover
- ISBN: 0-441-38297-5
- OCLC: 18007379
- Preceded by: Janissaries: Clan and Crown
- Followed by: Janissaries IV: Mamelukes (Unpublished; Working Title)

Janissaries III: Storms of Victory is a science fiction novel by American writers Jerry Pournelle and Roland J. Green, the third book of Pournelle's Janissaries series (the first was titled simply Janissaries). It was originally published in 1987 and, unlike the first two books in the series, was not illustrated. In 1996 Janissaries III: Storms of Victory appeared in a double novel with the second book in the Janissaries series, Janissaries: Clan and Crown as Tran.

== Plot ==
The book continues the adventures of Captain Rick Galloway's Earth-born mercenaries on the planet Tran as they continue to carve out an area of conquest and necessary alliances with Tran's native human population, in order to serve the alien Shalnuksis. The Shalnuksis are members of a galactic Confederation which uses humans as slave soldiers/administrators (hence the series title "Janissaries"), but they are keeping Tran a secret from the Confederation in order to profit from a drug that can only be grown there.
