= Janissaries (series) =

Series of science fiction novels by Jerry Pournelle and Roland J. Green

- Janissaries; Janissaries II: Clan and Crown; Janissaries III: Storms of Victory; Tran; Lord of the Janissaries; Mamelukes: A Janissaries Novel
- Author: Jerry Pournelle (books 1–6); Roland J. Green (co-author, books 2–5); Phillip Pournelle & David Weber (book 6)
- Illustrator: Luis Bermejo; Josep M. Martin Sauri
- Country: United States
- Language: English
- Genre: Military fiction; Political fiction; Science fiction
- Published: 1979–1996; 2015; 2020
- Media type: Print
- No. of books: 6

Janissaries are an American series of military and political-based science fiction novels are set in an interstellar confederation of races, in which humans are a slave race entrusted with military affairs and law enforcement. They were written by Jerry Pournelle, with Roland J. Green co-authoring the second two books.

== Works ==
Title	Date of Publication	ISBN	Authors	Notes
Janissaries	July 1, 1979	ISBN 0-671-87709-7	Jerry Pournelle	
Janissaries: Clan and Crown	November 1, 1982	ISBN 0-441-38294-0	Jerry Pournelle and Roland J. Green	
Janissaries III: Storms of Victory	April 1, 1987	ISBN 0-441-38297-5	Jerry Pournelle and Roland J. Green	
Tran	August 1, 1996	ISBN 0-671-87741-0	Jerry Pournelle and Roland J. Green	Omnibus edition of Janissaries: Clan and Crown and Janissaries III: Storms of Victory.
Lord of the Janissaries	August 16, 2015	ISBN 1-476-78079-X	Jerry Pournelle and Roland J. Green	Omnibus edition of Janissaries and Tran.
Mamelukes: A Janissaries Novel	June 2, 2020	ISBN 1-982-12462-8	Jerry Pournelle, Phillip Pournelle, and David Weber	

== Overall story arc of the series ==
A small force of mostly American troops, mercenaries under a secret CIA contract in Africa during the Cold War about to be annihilated by a Cuban military force, is "rescued" by the Shalnuksis, extraterrestrial beings part of an interstellar Confederation who offer them their lives in exchange for service on a primitive planet raising surinomaz ("madweed"), a plant used to produce a recreational drug. The primitive planet, called Tran, is populated by other humans of terrestrial origin, who have been secretly brought there at 600 year intervals over the past several thousand years of Earth history for the same purpose. In the Confederation, humans are a slave soldier and administrator class vaguely similar to the Janissary soldiers of the Ottoman Turkish Empire, hence the name of the first novel and the series.

The series of novels describe how these 20th-century soldiers proceed to both integrate with the existing cultures on Tran and use them to establish a base of operations for growing and harvesting of the surinomaz plant, which only becomes sufficiently potent for use as a recreational drug for a couple of decades out of every 600 Earth years. The first book shows how the soldiers use a combination of modern weaponry, knowledge of technology, and advanced military tactics to carve out a political enclave that will enable them to fulfill the rest of their mission, to raise the madweed they are expected to provide to the extraterrestrials who brought them to Tran. The subsequent books illustrate the further adventures of the human soldiers as they perform their mission, but also begin to raise the standard of civilization and the level of technology among the disparate cultures of the humans on Tran.

As the mercenaries learn more of the history of Tran, it also becomes clear that they will eventually be betrayed by their benefactors, as this has been the fate of each generation of imported soldiers in turn. Their leader, Rick Galloway, begins to plan how they, and more important, the knowledge they have brought to Tran, will survive that betrayal, which involves the Shalnukskis using atomic bombs to destroy the areas of the planet controlled by the mercenaries. There are local legends of sky gods who bring gifts, but always take them back again; dragons melting a city with skyfire (a tapestry in the Great Hall of a castle prominently features this); and taboo places, including a lake with a glass bottom. Galloway, his native wife Tylara (the Eqetassa of Chelm), and Gwen Tremaine, the "wife" of the human pilot who brought the Terrans to Tran, are determined that the knowledge that will allow Tran to climb beyond the late Roman Empire level will survive the inevitable bombings. Once the Shalnukskis have gone, they will not return for 600 years; and as Galloway points out, in 100 years Earth went from the steam engine to landing on the Moon.

At the same time, forces beyond their control and of which they have no knowledge begin to plan for what appears to be a possible revolt of all humans in the Confederation, which would have drastic consequences for Earth.

== The Confederation ==
The immediate saviors of the doomed human soldiers are representatives of a race of beings called the Shalnuksis. The Shalnuksis are traders looking to continue to profit from the trafficking of a recreational drug that is obtained only from the planet Tran. The planet is generally unknown amongst the other races of the Confederation, a secret the Shalnuksis are intent upon maintaining. While their drug trafficking is not illegal per se, the use of "wild" humans (humans taken from Earth, not descended from the slaves of the Confederation) to produce the drug is something that would be stopped if it were known, thus the need for secrecy.

=== Confederation technology ===
Confederation technology includes the all-important "phase drive", a type of faster-than-light travel. Pournelle never explains what the drive is, or suggests how it works. Ships using it, however, vanish from normal space while under way. While Confederation technology appears quite advanced, it doesn't seem quite as advanced as one might expect from a civilization that had had space travel for over 5,000 years. Pournelle has Gwen Tremaine talk about how the Confederation has become stagnant in its stability, however, so this might be a deliberate technological decision. One reason an independent space-going humanity might be a threat could be the unregulated and destabilizing effect ever-advancing and evolving technology such as exists on Earth could pose.

=== Confederation culture ===
The Confederation is an interstellar and multi-species civilization that is rank with politics, intrigue, and corruption. The enslaved humans, bred for loyalty and obedience, comprise the primary armed force of the Confederation. They keep the peace between the various species. Earth is left untouched primarily as a source of "wild" human genes for the Confederation masters to use to breed initiative into their "tame" humans to keep them capable of performing their important functions.

However, with Earth civilization becoming more and more capable of the beginnings of space travel, there is debate within the Confederation about what to do about Earth. Leave the "wild" humans alone? Bomb them back to the Stone Age to prevent them from upsetting the status quo? Or bring them forcibly into the Confederation and stifle their progress? Fortunately for Earth, the various alien species are splintered into many factions. Their tendency to "not kick over the apple cart" barring a drastic change in circumstances is working in humanity's favor.

The Shalnuksis' use of humans on Tran to raise surinomaz is not known to the Confederation, though selected human janissaries know of it. It is also illegal. Some of the humans who are aware of Tran's existence also want to keep it secret so that if the Confederation decides to bomb Earth or bring it into the Confederation, there would at least still be a place where there are free humans.

== Continuation of the series ==
Pournelle made several statements on his blog that he was working on a fourth book in the series, the working title being Janissaries IV: Mamelukes. He was not collaborating with anyone.

His Works in Progress web page, dated April 2007, stated that Mamelukes was then 75,000 words into an ultimate length of 80,000. In December 2011, Pournelle stated that Mamelukes stood at 140,000 words, with 10,000 until completion. In July, 2014 that had risen to 151,000 with the final battle and ending remaining.

Pournelle posted the first three chapters of Mamelukes on his website.

With Pournelle's death in September 2017 the future of the series seemed to be very much in doubt. But it was reported in December 2018 that Jerry's son Phillip was in the second draft of Mamelukes working with American selling science fiction and fantasy author David Weber as editor. On 15 November 2019 Jerry's View from Chaos Manor was updated with the news that Mamelukes (Janissaries 4) was finished, and it was published in hard cover on 2 June 2020.
