= Janissaries (novel) =

1979 novel by Jerry Pournelle

- First edition
- Author: Jerry Pournelle
- Cover artist: Enrich
- Language: English
- Series: Janissaries series
- Genre: Science fiction
- Publisher: Ace Books
- Publication date: July 1st, 1979
- Publication place: United States
- Media type: Print Paperback
- Pages: 335
- ISBN: 0-671-87709-7
- OCLC: 34496595
- Followed by: Janissaries: Clan and Crown

Janissaries is a science fiction novel by American author Jerry Pournelle. Originally published in 1979, and illustrated by comic artist Luis Bermejo, it is the first book of Pournelle's Janissaries series. The following books are Janissaries: Clan and Crown, Janissaries III: Storms of Victory and Janissaries IV: Mamelukes.

Like King David's Spaceship, a novel in Pournelle's CoDominium Series, it is the story of a capable military leader undertaking campaigns on a backward planet.

== Plot introduction ==
In Janissaries, the leader is a United States Army officer from the Cold War period, Captain Rick Galloway, who along with his platoon-sized unit of soldiers primarily from the U.S. are abducted from a CIA-run operation against Cubans in the fictional tropical African country of Sainte-Marie by a flying saucer. The beings abducting them present themselves as rescuers from a hopeless situation where Galloway's unit is about to be overrun by Cubans in a night assault, the aftermath of which is expected to be the deaths of all. Afterwards, the human soldiers have the option of serving the aliens in a special situation involving a more primitive planet on which there are humans living in medieval conditions. The soldiers are expected to be able to use their superior weapons and tactics to conquer part of the planet.

== Plot summary ==
In the midst of the Cold War, the CIA has recruited a number of soldiers to fight as U.S. proxies against communist Cubans in the fictional tropical African country of Sainte Marie. Nearly all of the soldiers are from the U.S. military, though some seem to be genuine soldiers of fortune. After some success, they suffer combat reversals and are on the run. Part of the group secures a hilltop for aerial evacuation. Others, too wounded to move quickly, but capable of fighting in place, have set an ambush at a crossroads to slow down the pursuing Cubans long enough for helicopters to arrive.

The fifty or so troops on the hilltop are commanded by Captain Rick Galloway, Lieutenant Andre Parsons and the highly experienced Sergeant Major Elliott. They hear the sounds of their comrades at the crossroads being overrun; it becomes clear that the Cubans will soon assault the hill. They are able to contact headquarters on the radio but, instead of the hoped-for rescue, they are told the helicopters will not be coming and are ordered to surrender to the Cubans.

Knowing that the best they can expect from Cubans if they surrender is execution, they refuse the order and begin to prepare a hopeless defense. Then a "flying saucer" approaches and lands. Captain Galloway enters the craft, then re-emerges and tells his men that it is a CIA aircraft. He orders everyone to get aboard with all equipment. Some of the mercenaries had fled at the approach of the craft, but Rick and thirty-eight others board.

The craft, crewed by aliens, takes them to a base on the far side of Earth's moon. There they are told by a human administrator called Agzaral, who describes himself as the representative of an interstellar confederation, that their leaving Earth was permanent and that they can either work for their alien rescuers, the Shalnuksis, or face an uncertain future in a civilization that has little use for unskilled humans (the same kind of slave-soldier deal offered to the eponymous Janissaries of the Ottoman Empire). The Shalnuksis want the mercenaries to take control of sufficient land on a primitive planet called Tran to grow a crop of illegal, mind-altering recreational plants, which they will trade with the Shalnuksis for necessities and luxuries. There are already humans there, descended from previous Shalnuksis drop-offs, in various states of civilization, all of them well behind that of 20th century Earth. With their modern weapons, they are told, they should be able to take over and live like kings.

The mercenaries are set down on Tran and are joined by another Earthling, Gwen, the girlfriend of the spaceship pilot. She had become pregnant with the pilot's child and, since the Shalnuksis would not have allowed the child to live, she chose abandonment instead. Soon afterwards Parsons leads a mutiny because he believes Rick to be too soft for the task at hand. Rick and Corporal Mason are banished, with Gwen electing to go with them. Parsons then takes the mercenaries and helps a local leader, Sarakos, invade and conquer the kingdom of Drantos.

Rick's group head in the opposite direction and soon encounter a small party of locals led by a young woman named Tylara, a former duchess of Drantos, who recently escaped the captivity of Sarakos. She is fleeing with two companions back to her homeland, Tamaerthon, where her father Drumold is Grand Chief. Rick decides to join them, and in due course gains his people a new home.

When they arrive Rick learns that the highland-living Tamaerthans, who are descended from Celtic arrivals from over 2,000 years ago, have a desperate problem. Due to adverse weather conditions their recent harvest was poor and many will starve in the coming winter unless something is done. Rick organizes and trains the Tamaerthans to fight more effectively, mingling their exceptional longbowmen with defensive pikemen. He then leads them on a raid on an outpost of the neighboring, powerful empire established by humans kidnapped from ancient Rome during the reign of Septimius Severus. The local Roman governor, Marselius, attacks with his heavy, cataphract-like cavalry and is soundly defeated by the pike-longbow combination of the Tamaerathans. After winning the battle, the Tamaerathans obtain enough food to last the winter. Paradoxically, Rick manages to form an alliance with Marcellus that will ensure there will be no reprisals for the raid. Tylara and Rick fall in love and prepare to be married in the spring.

Then an opportunity arises to restore Tylara to her former position in Drantos, which will put Rick squarely in opposition to Parsons and his remaining men (two-thirds having deserted). Initially reluctant, Rick comes up with a plan to end Sarakos's dominion over Drantos and begins production of artillery superior to anything except the heavy weapons of the mercenaries. On the eve of battle, having prepared a gunpowder mine trap to kill all of Parsons' men just before dawn, Rick decides to meet with Parsons to try to get him to switch sides in an attempt to avoid killing the mercenaries. Parsons attempts to assassinate him, however Tylara shoots him first. With the death of Parsons, all of his mercenaries join Rick. Without their support, and with the modern tactics and weapons, Sarakos is easily defeated.

== Adaptation ==
In February 2013, Variety reported that motion picture rights to Janissaries had been acquired by the newly formed Goddard Film Group, headed by Gary Goddard. In October 2013, the IMDbPro site reported that the movie was in development, and that husband-and-wife writing team, Judith and Garfield Reeves-Stevens, had written the screenplay.
