= Douglas SASSTO =

Proposed reusable orbital launch vehicle

Douglas Aircraft's SASSTO, short for "Saturn Application Single Stage to Orbit", was a single-stage-to-orbit (SSTO) reusable launch system designed by Philip Bono's team in 1967. SASSTO was a study in minimalist designs, a launcher with the specific intent of repeatedly placing a Gemini capsule in orbit for the lowest possible cost. The SASSTO booster was based on the layout of the S-IVB upper stage from the Saturn family, modified with a plug nozzle. Although the SASSTO design was never followed up at Douglas, it is widely referred to in newer studies for SSTO launchers, notably the MBB "Beta" (Ballistisches Einstufiges Träger-Aggregat) design, which was largely an updated version of SASSTO.

== History ==
In 1962 NASA sent out a series of studies on post-Apollo launch needs, which generally assumed very large launchers for a crewed mission to Mars. At Douglas, makers of the S-IVB, Philip Bono led a team that studied a number of very large liquid-fueled boosters as a way to lower the cost of space exploration. His designs were based on an economy of scale which makes larger rockets more economical than smaller ones as the structure accounts for less and less of the overall weight of the launcher. At some point the dry weight of the launcher becomes lower than the payload it can launch, after which increases in payload fraction are essentially free. However, this point is crossed at relatively large vehicle sizes - Bono's original OOST study from 1963 was over 500 feet (150 m) long - and this path to lower costs only makes sense if there is an enormous amount of payload that needs to be launched.

After designing a number of such vehicles, including ROOST and the ROMBUS/Ithacus/Pegasus series, Bono noticed that the S-IVB stage, then just starting to be used operationally, was very close to being able to reach orbit on its own if launched from the ground. Intrigued, Bono started looking at what missions a small S-IVB-based SSTO could accomplish, realizing that it would be able to launch a crewed Gemini capsule if it was equipped with some upgrades, notably an aerospike engine that would improve the specific impulse and provide altitude compensation. He called the design "SASSTO", short for "Saturn Application Single-Stage To Orbit".

These same upgrades would also have the side-effect of lowering the weight of the SASSTO compared to the original S-IVB, while at the same time increasing its performance. Thus the study also outlined a number of ways that it could be used in place of the S-IV in existing Saturn IB and Saturn V stacks, increasing their performance. When used with the existing Saturn I lower stage, it would improve payload to low Earth orbit from 35,000 to 52,500 lb (23,800 kg), or 57,000 lb (26,000 kg) if the landing gear were removed and it was expended like the S-IVB. SASSTO would thus give NASA a short-term inexpensive crewed launch capability, while also offering improved heavy-launch capability on the existing Saturn infrastructure.

SASSTO required a number of new technologies, however, which made development risky. In particular, the performance of the aerospike engine had to be considerably higher than the J-2 it would replace, yet also offer the ability to be restarted multiple times as the single engine was used for launch, de-orbit and landing. Of particular note was the final landing burn, which required the engines to be restarted at 2,500 ft (760 m) during the descent. The vehicle's weight was also greatly reduced, almost by half, which would not have been trivial considering the relatively good performance of the S-IVB design.

== Design ==
Although the SASSTO claimed the S-IVB as its starting point, this was a conceit, and the vehicle had little in common with the S-IVB except its size.

The internal fuel tankage was considerably different from in the S-IV. The LH2 was no longer cylindrical, but spherical, and moved to the forward location in the fuselage. The LOX tankage, originally on top of the LH2, was re-positioned into a series of smaller spherical tanks arranged in a ring below the LH2. The tanks were all moved forward within the airframe compared to the engine, all of these changes being made in order to reduce changes in the center of gravity as the fuel was burned off. The fuselage section immediately above the engine was necked down, forming what appeared to be a larger single plug. The upper section of the fuselage, over the top of the hydrogen tank, was likewise necked down.

In order to increase the amount of LH2 being carried, given the fixed dimensions, SASSTO proposed freezing 50% of the fuel to produce a slush hydrogen mixture. This improvement was not uncommon in designs of the era, although it was not until the 1990s that any serious development work on the concept was carried out.

The rearmost portion of the spacecraft was a single large plug nozzle, fed by a series of 36 injectors operating at 1500 psia, producing 277,000 lbf (1,230 kN) of thrust. Since plug nozzles gain efficiency as they grow larger, the 465 sec specific impulse (compared to the J-2's 425) was not particularly aggressive. The engine also served as the primary heat shield, actively cooled by liquid hydrogen that was then dumped overboard.

Four landing legs extended from fairings on the fuselage sides, retracting to a point about even with the "active" portion of the engine area. Four clusters of small maneuvering engines were located between the legs, about half-way from front to back along the fuselage. A series of six smaller tanks arranged in the gaps between the LOX and LH2 tanks fed the maneuvering engines.

SASSTO delivered 6,200 lb (2,800 kg) of cargo to a 110 nmi (200 km) orbit when launched due east from the Kennedy Space Center. Empty weight was 14,700 lb (6,700 kg), considerably lighter than the S-IVB's 28,500 lb (12,900 kg), and gross lift off weight was 216,000 lb (98,000 kg). The typical payload was the Gemini, which was covered with a large aerodynamic fairing.

Re-entry maneuverability was through a blunt-body lifting profile, similar to the Apollo CSM. The cross-range was limited, about 230 miles (370 km), and there was basically no maneuverability at all on final approach. There was enough fuel for about 10 seconds of hovering and small maneuvers to select a flat landing spot. Because SASSTO was the same basic size as the S-IVB, Douglas proposed transporting it in the existing Aero Spacelines Super Guppy after landing at either Wendover Air Force Base in Utah, or Fort Bliss outside El Paso, Texas.

== Developments ==
Dietrich Koelle used SASSTO as the starting point for a similar development at Messerschmitt-Bölkow-Blohm in the late 1960s. Unlike Bono's version, Koelle used as much existing technology and materials as possible, while abandoning the need for the specific S-IVB sizing. The result was a slightly larger spacecraft, the Beta, that launched 4,000 lb (1,800 kg) of payload without the use of slush fuel, advanced lightweight construction, or a real aerospike engine. As part of the Beta proposal, Koelle pointed out that even the existing S-IVB could reach orbit, with zero payload, if equipped with a high-pressure LOX/LH2 engine of 460 Isp.

Gary Hudson, in 1991, pointed out that such an engine existed, the RS-25, using a RS-25-powered S-IVB as a thought experiment to demonstrate the real-world feasibility of SSTO launchers. This study was part of his "Phoenix" series of launchers, all similar to the SASSTO.

== See also ==
- List of space launch system designs
