= Philip Bono =

Philip Bono

Philip Bono (13 January 1921 – 23 May 1993) was a Douglas Aircraft Company engineer. He was a pioneer of reusable vertical landing single-stage to orbit launch vehicles. As a visionary designer, he is credited with inventing the first version of a recoverable single-stage spacecraft booster, and his contributions influenced spacecraft design.

Bono pursued single-stage space launch as simpler and cheaper. He realized to do this he would need to use high specific impulse liquid hydrogen/liquid oxygen rocket engines. Afterwards he proposed to make these vehicles reusable. From his ROOST design onwards Bono advocated space launch vehicles without wings, usually using rocket-assisted vertical takeoff and landing (VTVL). According to his estimates, wings consisted mostly of dead weight that decreased launch payload mass. He patented a reusable plug nozzle rocket engine which had dual use as a heat shield for atmospheric reentry. His early 1960s concepts influenced later designs like the 1990s Delta Clipper, also from Douglas.

== Birth, education and career ==
Philip Bono was born in Brooklyn, New York, on 13 January 1921. He graduated from the University of Southern California in 1947 with a degree in mechanical engineering. After graduation, Bono worked as a research and systems analyst for North American Aviation. Bono began working for Douglas Aircraft company in 1960. After the merger of McDonnell Aircraft and the Douglas Aircraft Company, he worked for McDonnell Douglas Astronautics from 1966 until 1988.

Philip Bono died on 23 May 1993 at the age of 72. He was a resident of Costa Mesa, California, at the time of his death.

Less than three months after Bono's death, the first launch vehicle based on his designs, the McDonnell Douglas DC-X (Delta Clipper) began a largely successful series of test flights. The DC-X was a vertical-takeoff and vertical landing vehicle. The series of test flights began on 18 August 1993 and continued until the upgraded version of the launch vehicle (renamed the DC-XA) tipped over on landing on July 31, 1996.

Among Bono's visionary designs was a 1960 Boeing design for a crewed Mars spacecraft capable of carrying eight.

== Designs ==
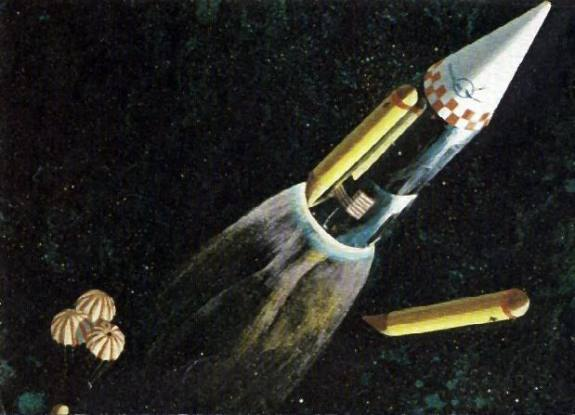
ROMBUS

- One Stage Orbital Space Truck (OOST)
- Recoverable One Stage Orbital Space Truck (ROOST)
- Reusable Orbital Module, Booster, and Utility Shuttle (ROMBUS)
- Ithacus
- Pegasus
- Hyperion
- SASSTO
- Mars Glider

Hyperion was HTVL, the others VTVL.

== Bibliography ==
- Bono, Philip; Gatland, Kenneth William (1969). Frontiers of Space. New York: Macmillan. ISBN 0-7137-3504-X.

== Patents ==
- US Patent D201773, Recoverable Single Stage Spacecraft Booster, July 27, 1965
- US Patent 3295790, Recoverable Single Stage Spacecraft Booster, January 3, 1967
