= RMS Laconia =

Two different ocean liners of the Cunard Steamship Lines have been named RMS Laconia. Although one was launched ten years after the other, and was the subject of a TV movie, they are easily confused; they had similar careers, looked much the same, and met similar fates.

- RMS Laconia (1911), launched in 1911 and sunk by a U-boat in 1917
- RMS Laconia (1921), launched in 1921 and sunk by a U-boat in 1942
