= Francis X. Kane =

American aerospace engineer

Colonel Francis "Duke" Xavier Kane
- Born: December 12, 1918
- Died: July 18, 2013 (aged 94)
- Notable work: Designer of NAVSAT, GPS and Co-Author of Strategy of Technology
- Spouse: Virginia C. Kane

Colonel Francis "Duke" Xavier Kane, Ph.D., USAF, retired, (December 12, 1918 – July 18, 2013 ) was the space planner and engineer responsible for the design concept of the Global Positioning System (GPS). Colonel Kane was General Bernard A. Schriever's Chief for Space and Ballistic Missile Planning at the U.S. Air Force Systems Command from 1961 to 1970. Colonel Kane was a participant in Project Forecast (1963–1964). Project Forecast was the longest-range technology forecast undertaken by the U.S. military prior to 1963. Project Forecast contemplated the strategic technological environment of 1975 and the requirements for U.S. advancements in air, space, missile, and computer technology.

== Classified project ==
In 1963, the Air Force Space Systems Division funded Colonel Kane to lead a classified project known as 621B. Phase I of 621B was for the engineering concept for a "space-based navigation system" that would later become known as the Global Positioning System (GPS/NAVSTAR). According to Colonel Brad Parkinson (USAF, retired), Project 621B had "many of the attributes that you now see in GPS. It has probably never been given its due credit."

Colonel Kane formed the 621B team consisting of Air Force engineers and Aerospace Corporation contractors in Los Angeles to lay the foundation for GPS development. The concept of operations established in Phase I was for a space-based system enabling 3-dimensional location (longitude, latitude, and altitude) globally, in all weather, at all times transmitting on a frequency established by the Scientific Advisory Board. The satellites use a time-differ-ence-of-arrival concept using precise satellite position and on-board atomic clocks to continuously generate navigation messages that can be received by users anywhere on Earth. The engineering concept addressed that a minimum of 24 satellites would be required for global coverage, at an altitude of 10,000 nautical miles, at 55 degrees inclination, and powered by hybrid solar and battery energy sources.

== GPS studies ==
From 1964 to 1966, several Aerospace corporation team members made outstanding contributions to GPS studies on the U.S. Air Force 621B team led by Colonel Kane. "These men included of Phil Diamond, Peter W. Soule, James B. Woodford, Alfred Bogen, Richard Dutcher, Howard F. Marx, and Hideyoshi Nakamura. It was Nakamura and some of his coworkers who suggested that range measurements for an aircraft should be calculated using signals from four satellites. The aircraft's crewmembers could then obtain a three-dimensional position by measuring four distinct differences in the signals' arrival times and then adding these to a clock connected to a quartz oscillator. Each satellite would also have its own clock, which would be updated continuously by ground signals. In essence, this was the operational concept that eventually led to GPS as it is known today."

In 1967, under Phase II of 621B, system design, Colonel Kane and a team from TRW refined the concept of operation, performed engineering design for multiple systems, began test programs for receivers, conceptualized satellite control and operations including on-orbit tracking (satellite/star tracking), and preliminary design of the GPS satellites.

== Hall of Fame ==
For his role in space technology development and the engineering design concept of GPS, Colonel Kane was inducted into the U.S. Air Force Space and Missile Pioneers Hall of Fame at Lackland A.F.B., San Antonio, Texas, March 2, 2010. Colonel Kane's role in space systems development is authenticated by the U.S. Air Force Space and Missile Command including: "Concepts forwarded by Colonel Kane during the 1960s included space-based missile warning (Defense Support Program), space-based missile defense, manned maneuvering reentry vehicles (Space Shuttle), detection and attack of mobile missiles, laser anti-satellite weapons [ASAT], the advanced ballistic missile (MX or Peacekeeper), and a navigation satellite (NAVSTAR/GPS) system."

Colonel Kane's role in U.S. national competitiveness, innovation, and security is one of planner, design engineer, and technology strategist. He conceptualized a systems approach to space planning that provided a platform upon which General Schriever executed a high technology defense strategy to build the U.S. Air Force space and missile capability—ushering in the Space Age.

On May 16, 2019, Col Kane's name was inscribed on the Schriever Wall of Honor at Los Angeles AFB, CA to commemorate his life-long contributions to the space enterprise.

== Book ==
The book "Strategy of Technology" (1970) sets forth the doctrine flowing from the early plans developed by Project Forecast and the development and deployment of the Intercontinental Ballistic Missile (ICBM) system. Initially, Kane was unnamed in the 1970 publication of the book. Stefan T. Possony and Jerry Pournelle were able to later add Colonel Kane's attribution in 1972 after he retired (1970). The strategy of technology doctrine is exemplified by opponents' economies failing to keep pace with investments in high technology countermeasures. The doctrine is exemplified by a systems approach to engineering, science and acquisition.

After the 1980 election, President-elect Ronald Reagan asked General Schriever to prepare position papers on space policy and defense for the incoming administration. General Schriever asked Duke to prepare the papers, and Duke asked his friend and coauthor Jerry Pournelle to arrange a meeting of qualified people to work on it. The meeting included more than fifty aerospace scientists and participants including Buzz Aldrin, General Daniel Graham, rocket engineer Max Hunter, and George Merrick the North American manager of the Shuttle program. They also invited Dr. Stefan Possony, science fiction writers Poul Anderson and Robert Heinlein, Writer/engineer G. Harry Stine, and members of Edward Teller's team. The group met several times before and after the Reagan inauguration, and the papers, which advocated a policy of technological strategy and strategic defense, are said by many to have influenced President Reagan's "Star Wars" speech of 1983.

== Collaboration ==
During the summer of 2011, Duke collaborated with his friend Hu Davis (SolarHigh.org and Vehicle Manager Lunar Capsule 5, "Eagle", Apollo 11 and a participant in the 1980 space policy preparations; and a group of high school students led by Evan Gray from RAM STEM Academy in San Antonio, Texas on the future of space exploration including Space-Based Solar Power, Lunar, and Mars missions. During the “Solar Summer of 2011”, Duke led the high school team through a process that yielded the following thinking about the future: The “cloud” (cyber) and space are energy. The rockets, satellites, receiving stations, electrical grids, cars, homes, and businesses that consume space-based solar power are all robots. Thus, space-based solar power is one platform (the cloud) for energy, computing, communications, and robotics: Cloud 2.0. Duke's intellectual gift was a deep and impassioned ability to think, dream, imagine, question, reason, plan, and share his vision so that others could carry these designs into the future.

One of Duke's greatest concerns in his last days of work was the promotion of “creativity” and “collaboration” in the context of all that we do: from primary school education to international cooperation in cyber/space. For Duke, creativity and collaboration are the two most important qualities to engender in our pursuit of national security and economic competitiveness. Duke's legacy of creativity and collaboration is all around us: From the freedom we enjoy every day to the boom of hypersonic flight; however, for Duke his greatest achievement was in creating the Global Positioning System (GPS/NAVSTAR) so that we can all find our way home. For Duke, GPS was a way to find our footing, see ver the horizon and most importantly to loo-up up to the stars. GPS is as much a celestial star navigator as a compass and way-fider for planet Earth, By GPS time we time stamp every financial transaction earth, and at the same time GPS from Earth is the ultimate star calculator and pathfinder to the heavens visible from SOL's system within the Milky Way. For Duke, GPS, time, position, and location were as much an answer to where am I as it is a planning tool for questioning: when, how, and what are we going to do to change the world today.
