= Daniel O. Graham =

United States Army general

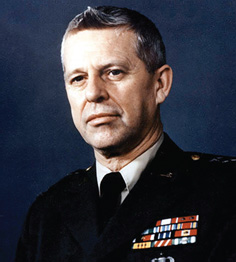
- Born: April 13, 1925; Portland, Oregon, U.S.
- Died: December 31, 1995 (aged 70); Arlington, Virginia, U.S.
- Burial place: Arlington National Cemetery
- Military career
- Allegiance: United States
- Branch: United States Army
- Rank: Lieutenant General
- Commands: Deputy Director, Central Intelligence Agency Director, Defense Intelligence Agency
- Other work: Strategic Defense Initiative, NASA, DC-X

Daniel Orrin Graham (April 13, 1925 – December 31, 1995) was a United States Army officer who ultimately rose to the rank of lieutenant general. Graham served in Germany, Korea, and Vietnam and received several decorations including some of the highest the United States military bestows: the Distinguished Service Medal, the Legion of Merit with two oak leaf clusters, and the Distinguished Intelligence Medal during his distinguished 30-year military career.

== Early life and education ==
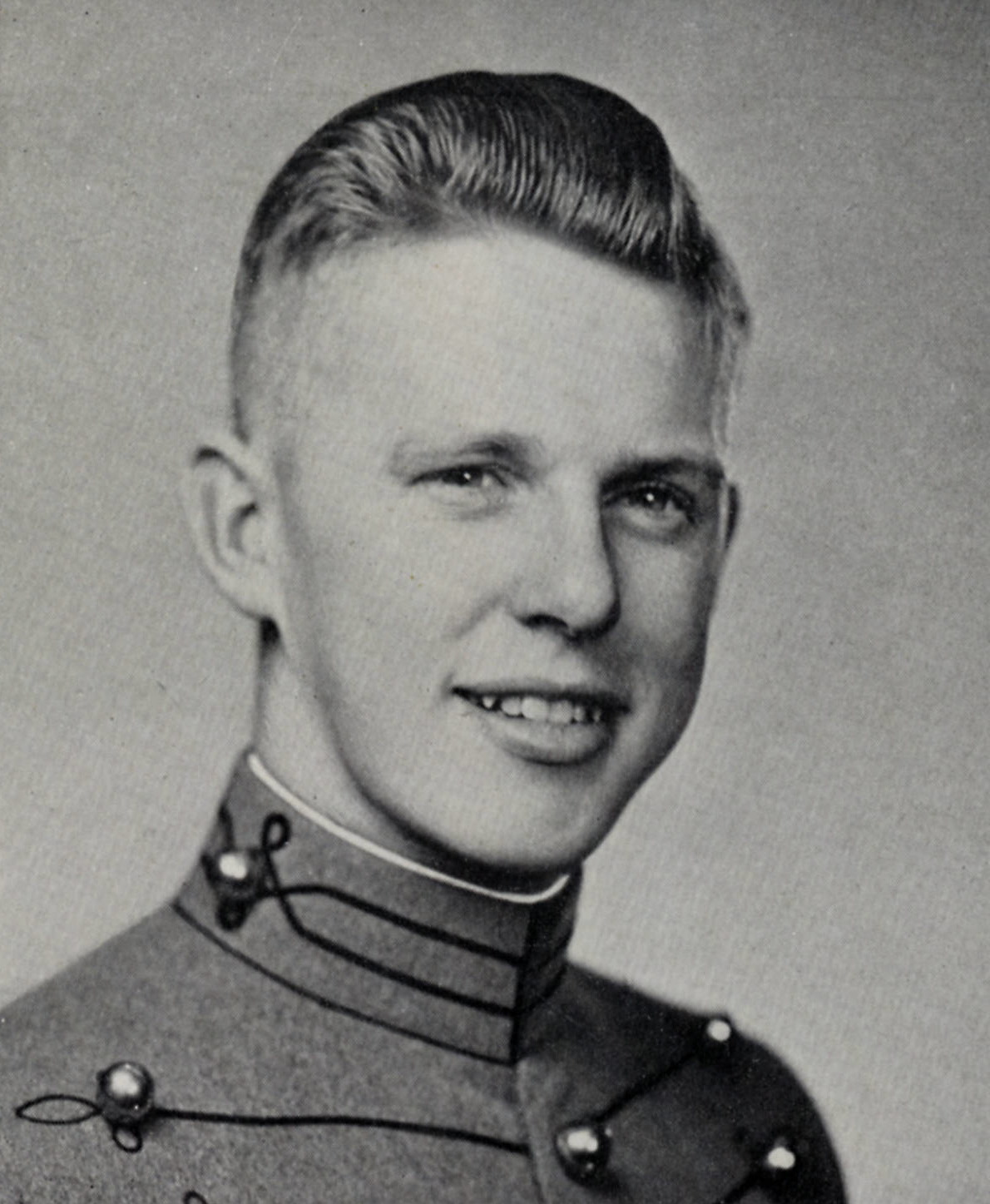
Graham as a United States Military Academy cadet c. 1946

Graham was born in Portland, Oregon and grew up in Medford. He attended college at the United States Military Academy at West Point and earned a B.S. degree in 1946. He also graduated from the Army Command and General Staff College in 1959 and the Army War College in 1967.

== History ==
From 1963 to 1966, Graham worked for the CIA in the Office of National Estimates. During the Vietnam War from 1967 to 1968 he was chief of the army's military intelligence estimates, serving in Saigon.

Graham served again in the Office of National Estimates during 1968–1971, then as Director of Collections for the Defense Intelligence Agency in 1971. During 1973–1974 Graham served as Deputy Director of the CIA under Director William Colby and from 1974 to 1976 he was the Director of the DIA. Ronald Reagan called upon General Graham to be his military advisor for his 1976 and 1980 campaigns. General Graham promoted the concept of SDI to President Reagan and is considered to be the father of SDI. General Graham is a member of the Military Intelligence Hall of Fame.

In later years, Graham devoted a lot of time to the research and development of Single-Stage To Orbit (SSTO) spacecraft in conjunction with NASA. McDonnell Douglas was awarded a contract to build an SSTO test vehicle on August 16, 1991, and named it the DC-X for Delta Clipper Experimental. The name honored the firm's successful Thor/Delta rocket and recalled the famous 19th-century commercial clipper ships. The McDonnell Douglas SSTO team saw the Delta Clipper as opening the "space trade routes in the same way that the Yankee Clipper ships opened the sea trade routes." The needs of the commercial launch industry thus were integral to the thinking of the McDonnell Douglas DC-X team. General Graham envisioned the DC-X as the perfect inexpensive launch and delivery vehicle for his proposed Brilliant Pebbles space-based ballistic missile defense shield.

The first test launch of the DC-X was on August 18, 1993. The test flight verified flight control systems and vertical landing capabilities and was deemed a success after reaching a 46 m altitude in a 59-second flight. The second flight on September 11, 1993, tested ascent and landing mode control and ground effects survey, reaching 92 m in a 66-second flight. The third test flight on September 30, 1993, demonstrated 180-degree roll and provided aerostability data while reaching 370 m during 57 second flight. Unfortunately, this marked the last test of first series as the vehicle was mothballed when SDIO funding ran out.

On June 20, 1994, the DC-X rose once again for the first flight of second series after additional SDIO funding was received. Operating with a full propellent load, the flight tested the radar altimeter in control loop and reached an altitude of 870 m during a 136-second flight. Demonstrating an unplanned event on June 27, 1994, the DC-X became the first unmanned vehicle to save itself when an in-flight abort occurred after a gaseous hydrogen explosion. The vehicle demonstrated its autoland capabilities after reaching an altitude of 790 meters during a 78-second flight. After repairs were made, the DC-X continued expansion of the flight envelope on May 16, 1995, demonstrating constant angle of attack after reaching an altitude of 1330 m during a 124-second flight. Graham was elated and continued to work closely with the program. Graham would not live to see the full glory of the DC-X program. He died in December 1995.

On Friday, June 7, 1996, at White Sands, New Mexico, the second series vehicle designated DC-XA was successfully launched. It flew to a height of 485 meters (1,591 feet) and then moved horizontally 105 meters (344 feet) before safely landing. After that flight, NASA officials announced that the DC-XA had been renamed the "Clipper Graham." The next day, June 8, 1996, to demonstrate the quick-turnaround capability of the rocket, the Clipper Graham soared into the skies over the old White Sands Missile Range to a height of 3,120 meters (10,240 feet) and stayed in the air for over two minutes before landing. That flight was the highest and longest the vehicle had ever flown until then.

Robert A. Heinlein dedicated his 1985 novel The Cat Who Walks Through Walls to Graham and eight of the other members of the Citizens' Advisory Council on National Space Policy.

== Political activism ==
Graham was chairman of the American Space Frontier Committee and the Coalition for the Strategic Defense Initiative, and in 1978 became co-chairman of the Coalition for Peace through Strength.

After he retired from the Army, Graham's goal was to promote a defense against nuclear weapons. The father of seven, said he felt it was unconscionable to fail to protect the American public against nuclear attack. Also, as a student of military history, he was keenly aware that no weapon was abandoned until a defense made the weapon obsolete.

In 1981, Graham founded High Frontier, Inc., a private organization that promoted a kinetic-energy weapons approach to space-based defense with help from members of President Ronald Reagan's "Kitchen Cabinet". Graham served as the Project Director for the think tank and released its strategic plan in a book entitled "We Must Defend America and Put an End to MADness" in 1983. Graham is considered by most to be the originator of the Strategic Defense Initiative concept. The plan as put forward by Reagan also included an emphasis on directed energy technologies such as lasers and particle beams, in addition to the cheaper, "off the shelf" kinetic energy technologies promoted by Graham and High Frontier.

The Strategic Defense Initiative Organization was renamed by President Bill Clinton to the Ballistic Missile Defense Organization on May 13, 1993, and continues today.

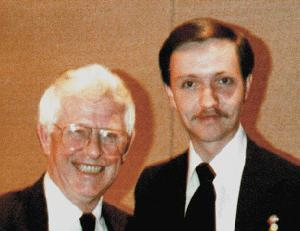
Daniel O. Graham, Founder and Director, High Frontier (left) and Rafael Picklesimer, Intelligence Specialist and Speech Writer, High Frontier (right) - 1988

General Graham was also an unsuccessful Republican candidate for the Arlington County, Virginia, Board of Supervisors after his retirement from the military.

== Quote From Ronald Reagan ==
"As you know, Dan, you and I were talking about missile defense before you set up High Frontier in September of '81...You and a small group of dedicated, determined people helped us move the SDI concept over all the roadblocks put up by people of less vision and belief in American capacity. God bless you!"—President Ronald Reagan, March 1993

== NASA’s Medal for Distinguished Public Service ==
In 1995, Daniel O. Graham was presented with NASA’s Medal for Distinguished Public Service by Dan Goldin. This award highlighted his impactful work, particularly in the promotion of space defense systems, the establishment of and the Space Transportation Association which supports policies that advance robust and affordable space transportation, and his involvement with NASA's research and development projects, including the Single-Stage To Orbit (SSTO) vehicle.

== Awards and decorations ==
Basic Parachutist Badge

	Army Distinguished Service Medal
	Legion of Merit with two bronze oak leaf clusters
	Army Commendation Medal
	American Campaign Medal
	World War II Victory Medal with Berlin Airlift Device
	Medal for Humane Action
	National Defense Service Medal with oak leaf cluster
	Vietnam Service Medal with three service stars
	Vietnam Staff Service Medal, First Class
	Vietnam Campaign Medal
NASA’s Medal for Distinguished Public Service Ribbon	NASA’s Medal for Distinguished Public Service

== Death ==
Graham died of cancer at his home in Arlington, Virginia on Sunday, December 31, 1995, at the age of 70. He was buried at Arlington National Cemetery with full military honors.

== Footnotes ==
Government offices
Preceded by Vincent P. De Poix	Director of the Defense Intelligence Agency; 1974–1975	Succeeded by Samuel V. Wilson
