= Household Gods =

Household Gods may refer to:

- Household deity, a deity or spirit that protects the home
- Household Gods (band), a rock band featuring members of Slint and Unwound
- Household Gods (novel), a 1999 science fiction time-travel novel
- Household Gods, a 1912 comedic play by Aleister Crowley
- Household Gods: The Religious Lives of the Adams Family, a 2019 non-fiction book by Sara Georgini
