= Exiles to Glory =

1978 novella by Jerry Pournelle

- First edition
- Author: Jerry Pournelle
- Cover artist: Boris Vallejo
- Language: English
- Series: CoDominium
- Genre: Science fiction
- Publisher: Ace Books
- Publication date: July 1978
- Publication place: United States
- Media type: Print (Paperback)
- Pages: 216
- ISBN: 0-441-22215-3
- OCLC: 4163458
- Preceded by: High Justice
- Followed by: Birth of Fire

Exiles to Glory is a science fiction novella by American writer Jerry Pournelle, published in 1978. It is a sequel to the stories in the collection High Justice. As with those stories, it weaves the story of pioneering individuals in space with considerations of the technical and financial challenges facing them. It was republished in an omnibus edition with High Justice in 2009 as Exile—and Glory.

Despite being written and published after the novel The Mote in God's Eye, which Pournelle co-authored with Larry Niven, the tone, style and themes of this novel are akin to a juvenile novel of the sort written by Robert A. Heinlein in the 1950s. Pournelle returns to his favorite themes of breakdown of the rule of law, the politics of entitlement and disdain for anti-technology activists.

This novel and the collection High Justice are thought by some to be part of the CoDominium series. However, there is no direct evidence for this in any of the stories, although there is nothing contradictory either. This novel's dedication page reads "For Dan Alderson, the sane genius". Alderson, at the Jet Propulsion Laboratory, conceived the Alderson drive and Langston field technologies used in the CoDominium stories. It is also related to the novel Birth of Fire and together with High Justice, they be seen as a starting point for the CoDominium series.

== Plot summary ==
An intelligent young misfit, Kevin Senecal, leaves Earth to escape various troubles, including a teen gang vendetta which the authorities will not act to stop, and bureaucratic interference in his studies for an engineering degree, in a culture where environmentalists and zero-growth advocates hold sway.

He enlists with the Hansen Corporation, a huge conglomerate which has re-located to the Moon, and is now involved in asteroid mining. He is to go to the asteroid Ceres. The journey involves laser launch from Earth to orbit, and a long voyage on a ship using the NERVA nuclear rocket technology. During the journey, all the passengers have to be involved in maintaining the shipboard environment, which includes algae to generate oxygen from photosynthesis.

Kevin falls in love with a mystery woman called Ellen MacMillan. Between them they deal with the consequences of sabotage of the ship by persons unknown, and find a way to effect the rendezvous at Ceres after the ship's computer is sabotaged. They use the expertise of Jacob Norsedal, a prototypical computer hacker who is also a top-notch mathematician and physicist.

At Ceres Ellen reveals herself to be an agent for Hansen investigating the mining work, which is plagued with irregularities. In particular, a new element called Arthurium is being mined on Ceres. This is a stable transuranic element of the kind predicted during the 1970s based on the theory of an Island of stability for elements of atomic number 114, 120 and 126. Being super-heavy, these elements sink into the cores of planets and are not accessible, but may be found in asteroids.

In the story, the arthurium is a possible catalyst for hydrogen fusion and is vital to both the economy of Earth and the future of spaceflight. Rival corporations and mineral interests on Earth want to steal the arthurium or stop its production. Anti-technology politicians would like to shut down all space industry and dedicate the money to the Welfare State.

Ellen is actually Glenda Hansen-Mackenzie, daughter of Aeneas Mackenzie and Laurie Jo Hansen, owner of the Hansen Corporation. She can foil the plots if she can access the Ceres computer system. However, she, Kevin and Jacob are marooned on one of Ceres' small satellites by the enemy agents. They improvise a steam-jet rocket which lets them land back on Ceres and bring an end to the intrigue.

== Reception ==
Algis Budrys, reviewing both Exiles to Glory and Pournelle's earlier West of Honor (1976) for the May 1979 issue of The Magazine of Fantasy & Science Fiction, found the latter to be "rather more sophisticated throughout". James Nicoll, writing in 2018, commented that the story had "not aged well".
