= War World (series) =

Science Fiction Book Series

War World is a series of collaborative science fiction books set in the CoDominium universe of Jerry Pournelle, some novels being co-authored by John F. Carr and Don Hawthorne, as well as Larry Niven and S. M. Stirling. It consists of ten short story anthologies by various authors as well as six novels. Most stories take place on a single world, Haven, and many involve battles between Haven's people and the ruthless, genetically engineered race of supersoldiers called Saurons.

== The War World Setting ==
The War World series is set mostly on a single world, Haven. It is a marginally habitable moon of a supergiant planet called Cat's Eye, the fourth planet in the Byer's Star system. Haven is synchronically tide-locked to its primary, giving it an 86-hour-43-minute-long day-night cycle with respect to Byer's Star and a 131-hour-55-minute Dimday/night cycle with respect to Cat's eye. It has a thin but breatheable atmosphere; this and its distance from Byer's Star make surface conditions on most of Haven very cold and dry, so much so that initial habitation is limited to a single large valley at the equator. Haven is originally settled by the Universal Church of New Harmony, but they are quickly joined by "involuntary colonists" (exiled criminals) from Earth, and later other exiles from the CoDominium. Following the defeat of the Saurons and the destruction of their homeworld by the forces of the Empire, a remnant of the Sauron forces occupy the planet as a last hidden refuge. Known HaBandari (The Band) clans are the fan Reenans, fan Gimbutas, fan Tellerman, and fan Haller.

== Contents ==
The books in this series were written by several authors. They consist of five collections of short stories and three collaborative novels. Each volume takes place in roughly chronological internal order, but starting in different time periods (for instance, CoDominium: Revolt on War World, chronologically the last collection in the series, is set during the earliest years of human settlement on Haven). Blood Feuds incorporates material that originally appeared in the short story collections. John F. Carr rejuvenated the series with the publication of War World: The Battle of Sauron, by Carr and Don Hawthorne (Pequod Press, 2007). The series is starting over with the publication of War World: Discovery (2010), edited by John F. Carr. The new books are published in chronological order, with Discovery providing background on the first surveys and colonization. The new volumes include fresh stories intermixed with ones from the original series, providing a more complete look at the War World universe.

== Publications ==
- War World, Vol 1: The Burning Eye (1988) ISBN 0-671-65420-9
  - "Prolog: Discovery" (unattributed)
  - "Haven" (unattributed) - Even before colonization, Haven is a source of conflict as factions fight to determine its status.
  - "Dream Valley" - Edward P. Hughes - On the prison world of Haven, the strong can enslave the weak... unless they're clever.
  - "The Toymaker and the General" - Mike Resnick - An expert in combat cyborgs is hunted down for his skills.
  - "The Deserter" - Poul Anderson - As the Empire withdraws, only a legendary strategist can preserve civilization on Haven.
  - "Rate of Exchange" - Roland Green and John F. Carr - With the Empire gone, Haven's economy has collapsed, and its social order is about to follow.
  - "The Coming of the Eye" - Don Hawthorne - Haven's fragmented nations must defend themselves against powerful Sauron invaders.
  - "The Great Beer Shortage" - Janet Morris and David Drake - The Saurons find they must not only conquer Haven, but themselves as well.
  - "Necessity" - S. M. Stirling - Refugees from the Sauron assault combine into a new nation, the HaBandari, who will become the Saurons' strongest enemy.
  - "Tribute Maidens" - Harry Turtledove - To maintain their breeding population, the Saurons demand the strongest daughters of those they conquer.
  - "A Lion to the Sea" - John Dalmas - As centuries pass, the Sauron domination of Haven grows stronger, driving many tribes further into the wilderness, and forming strange alliances among them.
  - "Discovery" (unattributed) - Does the Empire suspect that some Saurons have survived?
  - "Excerpt from Bar Lev's A Traveler's Tale of Twenty Worlds" (unattributed) - A fragment of evidence hints at the Saurons' fate.
- War World, Vol 2: Death's Head Rebellion (1990) ISBN 0-671-72027-9
  - Introduction (unattributed)
  - "The Face of the Enemy" - Don Hawthorne - As the Secession Wars grind on for generations, The Empire is driven to desperation and paranoia.
  - "Death's Head Patrol" - Roland Greene and John F. Carr - The Saurons thought they could just drop in and take Haven. They soon learned otherwise.
  - "Strong Blood" - G. C. Edmondson - As starving refugees flee from the Saurons into the harsh wilderness, they must learn new ways to survive... including some that they would never have considered before.
  - "Brenda" - Larry Niven - On the planet Tanith, one Sauron has also survived, and found a way to blend into the population - literally.
  - "Some Things Survive" - John LaValley - A single ship from the planet Frystaat is sent out to hunt the last remaining Saurons, in what most believe is a fools' errand.
  - "No Such Thing as a Non-Lethal Weapon" - James Landau - Haveners must now adapt to a more violent world, but sometimes even a pacifist can find a way to fight.
  - "Loved Not I Honor More" - Martin Tays - The Sauron practice of taking "tribute maidens" for breeding drives some to the greatest lengths for revenge.
  - "The Field of Double Sowing" - Harry Turtledove - The Sauron breeding program is not perfect; sometimes those who are rejected as "inferior" can prove to be of great worth. A retelling of Oedipus Rex.
  - "Far Above Rubies" - Susan Shwartz - The Haveners have learned the value of Sauron genes, and seek to add them to their own bloodlines at every opportunity, by adopting their outcast children.
  - "Tayok's Base" (unattributed)
- War World, Vol 3: Sauron Dominion (1991) ISBN 0-671-72072-4
  - "Prologue" (unattributed)
  - "War World Economics" - (unattributed) - The HaBandari are a Havener nation descended from refugees, bandits and exiled soldiers. Their greatest strength is not just their superb military abilities, but their habit of making shrewd alliances...
  - "The Gates of Paradise" - Don Hawthorne - Controlling the access to the few deep valleys on Haven is vital, for only there does the air contain enough oxygen for safe childbirth.
  - "Maitreya and the Cyborg" - John Dalmas - The last surviving Sauron Cyborg encounters a society that cannot be cowed by military force.
  - "Building a Pillar" - John LaValley - An isolated Frystaater community on Haven must make contact with outsiders to survive; but there is too much room for potentially deadly misunderstanding.
  - "Aegir's Children" - Phillip Pournelle - A seafaring society may hold the key to a new industrial age for Haven, if the Saurons don't destroy them first.
  - "Ceremonies at the Last Bar in the Village" - John Hartnett - Saurons don't make allies, they conquer! But a little gesture of friendship never hurt.
  - "Juchi the Accursed" - Harry Turtledove - A blind old man and his teenage daughter cannot possibly be a threat to the mighty Saurons. At least, that's what they tell themselves...
  - "Seven Against Nûrnen" - Susan Shwartz - Seven warriors unite to take down Haven's masters, and a legend begins.
  - "Shame and Honor" - S. M. Stirling - A female warrior of the HaBandari must reluctantly ally with a Sauron soldier to survive in hostile territory.
- War World, Vol 4: Invasion (1994) ISBN 0-671-87616-3
  - "Introduction" - Charles E. Gannon - On the refueling station which shares its orbit with Haven, the withdrawal of the Empire has made life very hard—but the coming of the Saurons will make it much harder.
  - "The Railroad" - John Dalmas - As news of the Saurons' coming slowly spreads across Haven, its people experience a growing sense of shock and horror.
  - "A Better Kind of War" - Don Hawthorne - Since the Empire left, Haveners had been at war with each other. Now the Saurons had come to give them a common enemy, but old hates are hard to put aside.
  - "The Boatswain" - Alan Brown - A small group of refugees seeks safety with help from an old, retired naval hero.
  - "The Gift of the Magi" - Charles E. Gannon - Rumors tell of a small band on Haven who still retain the old knowledge of science and technology. But they're only rumors... aren't they?
  - "A Little Beastliness" - Edward P. Hughes - As the Saurons continue to hunt down and destroy all remnants of Haven's industries, many find that to survive, they must act like harmless primitives... for the rest of their lives.
  - "Those Who Lose" - Harry Turtledove - The Saurons are ruthless in their conquest. To them, slavery and rape are merely tools of policy.
  - "Kings Who Die" - S. M. Stirling - On Haven, the age of history is over. It is now an age of legends; and the leader of the newly formed HaBandari tribe must die a hero, to become a Legend that will live on and inspire others to fight.
- CoDominium: Revolt on War World (1992) ISBN 0-671-72126-7
  - "The Lost and the Founder" (unattributed) - A small-time hustler starts a movement that will someday go to the stars.
  - "The Garden Spot" - Don Hawthorne - Haven is a wasteland from pole to pole; but even it has resources worth fighting for... and killing for.
  - "In Concert" - E. R. Stewart - The Church of Harmony thought they would have the barren moon Haven all to themselves, but Earth's politicians had other ideas.
  - "Janesfort War" - Leslie Fish and Frank Gasperik - Haven has become a dumping ground for criminals, and some eccentric locals decide to hire a few protectors.
  - "The Coming of the Dinneh" - John Dalmas - Apache rebels from Earth are exiled to the ultimate reservation—Haven!
  - "Politics of Melos" - Susan Shwartz - A naïve aristocrat from Earth becomes a common convict on a hellish prison planet.
  - "Hang Together" - Harry Turtledove - War makes strange bedfellows; but none stranger than Russian nationalist fanatics and Estonian freedom fighters!
  - "Sons of Hawaii" - William F. Wu - A manipulative white-collar criminal and his naïve brother are exiled to Haven. Can two formerly wealthy sons of Hawaii survive, let alone thrive, on this dry, frigid world?
  - "Fire and Ice" - Eric Vinicoff - A rebellion is put down by an experimental group of surgically enhanced suicide soldiers, funded by a newly settled planet... called Sauron.
  - "Farewell to Haven" (unattributed)
- Blood Feuds (1992) ISBN 0-671-72150-X Susan Shwartz, S.M. Stirling, Judith Tarr, and Harry Turtledove - The HaBandari and their allies organise an uprising against the Sauron overlords. Combines material from "The Field of Double Sowing", "Far Above Rubies", "Juchi the Accursed", and "Seven Against Nûrnen", as well as original material.
- Blood Vengeance (1994) ISBN 0-671-72201-8 Susan Shwartz, S.M. Stirling, Judith Tarr, and Harry Turtledove - As the legend of the Seven swells into a movement that sweeps Haven, millions rise up to fight in the greatest and bloodiest battle this War World has ever seen.
- War World: The Battle of Sauron (2007) ISBN 0-937912-04-2 John F. Carr, Don Hawthorne - The Battle of Sauron chronicles the final battle in the war between the Empire of Man and the Sauron Coalition of Secession; this is the battle that will determine whether mankind is supplanted by the Saurons, a race dedicated to pan-eugenics and the military arts, or continues to reign triumphant over the disparate and far flung worlds of man. When a shipload of Saurons bent on conquest arrive unexpectedly, War World goes from pest-hole to Hellhole!
- War World: Discovery (2010) ISBN 978-0-937912-09-6 ed. John F. Carr - A new anthology containing five reprinted and nine original stories. - War World: Discovery is the opening volume in a series that will present War World's history in a chronological fashion for the very first time.
  - "The Lost and the Founder" - E. R. Stewart - (reprinted from CoDominium: Revolt on War World) (1998 AD) A small-time hustler starts a movement that will someday go to the stars.
  - "Discovery" (Jerry Pournelle) - (expanded version of "Prolog: Discovery" from War World, Vol 1: The Burning Eye) (2032 AD)
  - "The Garden Spot" - Don Hawthorne - (expanded from CoDominium: Revolt on War World) (2034 AD) Haven is a wasteland from pole to pole; but even it has resources worth fighting for... and killing for.
  - "In Concert" - E. R. Stewart - (reprinted from CoDominium: Revolt on War World) (2038 AD) The Church of Harmony thought they would have the barren moon Haven all to themselves, but Earth's politicians had other ideas.
  - "The Shimmer Stone Scam" - John F. Carr - (2041 AD)
  - "Nothing in Common" - Leslie Fish - (2044 AD)
  - "Hell's-A-Comin'" - John F. Carr - (2045 AD)
  - "Counterpoint" - A. L. Brown - (2045 AD)
  - "Astronomy Lesson" - Steven Shervais - Class Notes for Lecture #1, Applied Astronomy (Overview) - Notes on Haven, its parent star Cat's Eye, and the Byers System, presented as an astronomy lesson in school.
  - "On Jordan's Stormy Banks" - A. L. Brown - (2047 AD)
  - "Janesfort War" - Leslie Fish and Frank Gasperik - (reprinted from CoDominium: Revolt on War World) (2055 AD) Haven has become a dumping ground for criminals, and some eccentric locals decide to hire a few protectors.
  - "Last Chance" - Steven Shervais - (story told in 2063 AD, flashbacks from 2045 - 2056 AD)
  - "Steppe Stone" - William F. Wu - (2055 AD)
  - "Down the Rabid Hole" - Charles E. Gannon - (2057 AD & 2671 AD)
- War World: Takeover (2011) ISBN 978-0-937912-13-3 ed. John F. Carr -
- War World: Jihad! (2012) ISBN 978-0-937912-52-2 ed. John F. Carr -
- War World: The Lidless Eye (2013) ISBN 978-0-937912-50-8 ed. John F. Carr -
- War World: Cyborg Revolt (2013) ISBN 978-0-937912-51-5 ed. John F. Carr -
- War World: The Patriotic Wars (2017) ISBN 978-0-937912-69-0 ed. John F. Carr -
- War World: Falkenberg's Regiment (2018) ISBN 978-0-937912-73-7 John F. Carr -
- War World: The Fall of the CoDominium (2019) ISBN 978-0-937912-49-2 ed. John F. Carr -
- War World: Andromeda Flight (2021) ISBN 978-0-937912-77-5 - Doug McElwain -
- War World: Road Warriors (2023) ed. John F. Carr -
- "War World: The Falkenberg protectorate (2023) ed. John F. Carr & Mark Moeser-
