= Golden Horn (disambiguation) =

The Golden Horn is a historic inlet of the Bosphorus Strait in the Turkish city of Istanbul.

Golden Horn may also refer to:

- Zolotoy Rog, or Golden Horn Bay, a sheltered horn-shaped bay in the city of Vladivostok, separated from Peter the Great Gulf (Sea of Japan)
- Zlatni Rat, or Golden Horn, a spit of land in the Dalmatian Coast of Croatia
- Golden Horn (Colorado), a mountain in Colorado, US
- Golden Horn (Washington), a mountain in Washington state
- Golden Horns of Gallehus, an archaeological artifact
- Golden Horn (film), 1948 Kazakh film by Yefim Aron
- Golden Horn (horse), a thoroughbred racehorse
- The Golden Horn (novel), a 1985 fantasy novel

== See also ==
- Goldenhorn
