= King David's Spaceship =

1980 novel by Jerry Pournelle

- First UK edition
- Author: Jerry Pournelle
- Original title: A Spaceship for the King
- Cover artist: Peter Jones
- Language: English
- Series: CoDominium
- Genre: Science fiction
- Publisher: Simon & Schuster (US); Orbit Books (UK)
- Publication date: 1980
- Publication place: United States
- Media type: Print

King David's Spaceship is a science fiction novel by American writer Jerry Pournelle. It was originally published in 1980. Another version appeared as three-part serial in Analog as A Spaceship for the King from December 1971 to February 1972.

The novel forms part of Pournelle's Future history known as the CoDominium Series. Chronologically, it is second to last in the series, contemporaneous with events in The Mote in God's Eye.

In content it resembles Pournelle's military fiction series Falkenberg's Legion, also from the CoDominium series: both depict a capable military leader undertaking a campaign on a backward planet. In this case the leader is from a planet that has recovered technologically to the steam, steel and coal stage, who visits a planet of city states surrounded by barbarians, fighting with medieval weapons.

The story shows the conflicting motives of the different factions without demonizing any of them, save possibly the merchants' faction whose motives are to use the forces of the Imperial Space Navy to enhance their own profits.

== Plot summary ==
A planet called "Prince Samual's World" had been bombed heavily during the Secession Wars and had spent about 400 years in isolation. As a result, much of the technological knowledge of the First Empire was lost on the planet; when Second Empire spaceships found the planet, its technological level was somewhere around that of 19th century Europe.

For years, Colonel Nathan "Iron" MacKinnie had been famous on the planet for his masterful defense of the city-state republic of Orleans against the expansionist kingdom of Haven (ruled by King David). After allying with the Second Empire, Haven embarked on a new unification campaign, and MacKinnie set up a decisive battle that, had Orleans won, would have broken Haven.

However, unknown to MacKinnie, the new Haven campaign was a lure to get Orleans' forces into the field, so that the Second Empire's more advanced weaponry (including spaceships) could destroy them. These weapons quickly killed most of Orleans' troops, as well as MacKinnie's fiancée. After the loss of its army, Orleans was forced to surrender, and MacKinnie and other Orleans military leaders were then pensioned off by Haven authorities.

Months later, drinking in a Haven tavern with his former top sergeant, Hal Stark, MacKinnie overheard a drunken young Imperial officer boast of having been on Makassar, a primitive planet 12 light years away that had a store of First Empire knowledge in a surviving building that locals treated as a temple. Leaving the tavern, MacKinnie and Stark were arrested by the Haven secret police and taken to see their leader, Citizen Malcolm Dougal (who was secretly a key advisor to King David, although without official government portfolio). Dougal had learned through his spy network (and told MacKinnie) that under Imperial law, planets without crewed space travel at the time of assimilation into the Second Empire became colonies, governed by outworlders and at the mercy of the Imperial Traders Association; but planets with crewed space travel, even primitive space travel, became self-governing. Dougal thus offered MacKinnie an opportunity to go to Makassar disguised as a merchant/trader, to locate and return with scientific information from the library to help Haven build a spaceship. Dougal also told MacKinnie that every non-Imperial in the tavern who may have heard the Imperial officer's remarks had been killed, except for MacKinnie and Stark. To save both Stark's life and his own, MacKinnie accepted.

With Stark and a company of Haven agents not known to the Imperials, including Mary Graham, a young woman with a university education (highly unusual for Haven), MacKinnie boarded a spaceship of the Imperial Traders Association as the leader a merchant company looking for trade opportunities on Makassar. McKinnie's company was restricted to arming themselves with medieval chain mail, shields and swords, because Imperial law mandated that no more advanced technology may be introduced to a more primitive planet, and were fitted with Imperial space suits for the trip.

Reaching Makassar, MacKinnie and his company found few trade goods in the main city, because it was blockaded on both land and sea, which Dougal had anticipated would be the case, giving the company an excuse to travel to Batav, the city where the First Empire library/temple was located. MacKinnie, with the help of a former Haven Navy commander in his company, bought and refitted a sailing ship with leeboards. (Although a primitive technology to Imperials, leeboards were an advanced one in Makassar terms (which the Imperials failed to appreciate) that would allow their ship to travel much faster than any other on the planet). MacKinnie's ship then outran most of the blockading pirate ships and soon arrived in Batav, which was under the control of "temple" high priests who were themselves besieged by vast hordes of barbarian horsemen. There were also Second Empire missionaries stranded in Batav, who believed that the Traders allowed them to travel to Batav because the killing of Imperial missionaries would provide a pretext for Imperial intervention on Makassar.

MacKinnie convinced the high priests to let him recruit Batav citizens, including beggars and unemployed men, into an army to defeat the barbarians. After drilling and training them into a fighting force, he then maneuvered the most intelligent and suspicious of the high priests and Temple guards into a suicide mission, while his army defeated the barbarians by utilizing superior military tactics.

He used the resulting power vacuum to install the Second Empire missionaries as Batav's new religious leaders. The grateful clerics were unexpectedly supportive of MacKinnie's secret mission and were willing to allow MacKinnie's company full access to the library archives. One of MacKinnie's men was a physicist chosen for his eidetic memory, to research early plans for space travel. During this period, after an unsuccessful assassination attempt on MacKinnie by the barbarians (which wounded Stark), MacKinnie and Mary Graham, who served as commander of the commissary for MacKinnie's army, secretly became lovers.

MacKinnie and company (minus the injured Stark, who remained on Makassar as commander of the army in MacKinnie's name) then returned to Prince Samual's World. Back in Haven, Dougal's men used the acquired knowledge to build a primitive crewed spaceship, adopting a low-tech design of Robert Goddard—a rapid firing cannon using high-explosive shells detonating behind the ship to provide propulsion (but which might blow up the ship). Because the ship would not be airtight, only members of MacKinnie's company (who still had their spacesuits) could pilot it, and because it would only be able to carry a minimal payload, Graham (the lightest of the company) volunteered and was chosen as pilot. Before the launch, MacKinnie proposed to her, and she accepted. As soon as Prince Samual's World was unified, and in the presence of unsuspecting Imperial witnesses, Graham's ship was launched and achieved orbit, although it could not re-enter the atmosphere (meaning that the Imperials had to rescue Graham). King David then immediately requested that Prince Samual's World be admitted to the Second Empire as a self-governing world capable of crewed space travel, not as a colony.

The Imperials eventually conceded the self-governing issue, but they realized that MacKinnie and Graham (who have now become the most famous couple on the planet) were part of a Dougal plot to acquire knowledge from the First Empire library during the Makassar trip, which embarrassed the Imperial Navy. The Navy officers insisted that MacKinnie and Graham, at least, be visibly punished, while the Imperial political representatives wanted to give Makassar a chance to continue to develop independently. Using the pretext of Graham's illegal introduction of new technology—wooden horse collars—on Makassar, the political representatives offered MacKinnie and Graham exile on Makassar as punishment (while reminding them that Dougal was likely to execute them due to their fame), and they accepted.

== References to technology ==
In the novel, Graham introduced rigid wooden horse collars to Makassar to improve the efficiency of her commissary with the limited number of horses she had. Although this seemed like a trivial improvement, this was a disruptive technology on Makassar, because Makassar society still used slaves as draft animals. Makassar could not exploit the full ability of horses with its current technology: simple harnesses fastened around the neck. Each horse eats as much as five men and so must perform better than five men to be worth using, but it could not with a simple harness. However, with a wooden collar shifting the pulled weight to its shoulders, a horse could pull ten times as much as a man at high speed. The effect of this would be either to render a large number of slaves useless, or to free them for other uses. Either way, the economic structure of the society would change radically, and with it the political and power structure. This part of the novel is based heavily on the writings of Richard Lefebvre des Noëttes, which have since been questioned. Regardless, it is typical of Pournelle's work in its focus on the history of technology and European military history.

== Reception ==
Kirkus Reviews calls it a "disappointingly superficial prequel", and "mostly a for-kids-only item".
