= Laser Books =

Series of standalone novels

Laser Books was a line of 58 paperback (SF) novels published from 1975 to 1977 by Canadian romance powerhouse Harlequin Books. Laser published three titles per month, available by subscription as well as in stores. The books were limited to 50,000–60,000 words. They were numbered as a series, though each was a standalone novel. All of the covers were painted by artist Kelly Freas, who won the Hugo Award for Best Professional Artist many times for other work.

== History ==
The project was an attempt by Harlequin to replicate the success they'd had in the romance market by publishing science fiction novels on a regular schedule with consistent packaging and reliable contents. The editor was Roger Elwood, who had previously edited a large number of science fiction anthologies of varying quality. The Laser Books line was intended for a general audience, but it was mostly read by science fiction readers who were unsatisfied with the books, and the line was not commercially successful. Sales were between 20,000 and 30,000 per title, which was relatively low for science fiction at that time. Quality varied between books. A reviewer in 1976 described the line of books as "ersatz" and "imitative", although noted a few worthwhile books such as Blake's Progress by Ray Nelson.

According to The Encyclopedia of Science Fiction, "the books were restricted to a formula which specified a male protagonist, an upbeat ending, no sex or atheism, and a minimum of long words". Freas was assigned a specific formula for cover art. Several authors who worked with the Laser Books line had negative experiences with Elwood's editorial practices, and there were disputes over editorial requirements and payments. Tim Powers, whose first book was published by Laser, has said that the second book he wrote for Laser, An Epitaph in Rust, was published in a "grossly rewritten" form. An unedited version was later issued by a different publisher. Piers Anthony had problems with their publication of his novel But What Of Earth?, which was released with Robert Coulson credited as co-author. Anthony said that, without his permission, Elwood had directed Coulson to rewrite much of the book. This novel was also issued later, through Tor Books, with annotations from Anthony about the dispute.

The Laser line published the first or second books of several writers, and it was important to beginning writers such as Powers. It greatly expanded the market for 50,000- to 60,000-word books. When Harlequin closed the Laser line, all rights were reverted to the authors. Several works, including Jerry Pournelle's Exile to Glory, had been accepted and the acceptance payment made, but the book was not yet published. Those were also returned to the authors without any attempt to reclaim the advances paid. Many Laser books were later published by Pocket Books, Ace Books, and Tor Books. Some remain in print.

== Titles ==
0. Seeds of Change by Thomas F. Monteleone, 1975, ISBN 0-88950-900-X

This book was not numbered, and was not part of the actual series. It was a "Laser Books Limited Collector's Edition", not available for sale, given away at selected bookstores to launch the series and then given away with subscriptions to Laser Books or with mail-in orders. This novel was also given away at science fiction conventions in 1975, starting many science fiction fans collecting them.

1. Renegades of Time by Raymond F. Jones, 1975, ISBN 0-373-72001-7
2. Herds by Stephen Goldin, 1975, ISBN 0-373-72002-5
3. Crash Landing on Iduna by Arthur Tofte, 1975, ISBN 0-373-72003-3
4. Gates of the Universe by Robert Coulson with Gene DeWeese, 1975, ISBN 0-373-72004-1
5. Walls Within Walls by Arthur Tofte, 1975, ISBN 0-373-72005-X
6. Serving in Time by Gordon Eklund, 1975, ISBN 0-373-72006-8
7. Seeklight by K. W. Jeter, 1975, ISBN 0-373-72007-6
8. Caravan by Stephen Goldin, 1975, ISBN 0-373-72008-4
9. Invasion by Aaron Wolfe (pseudonym of Dean R. Koontz), 1975, ISBN 0-373-72009-2
10. Falling Toward Forever by Gordon Eklund, 1975, ISBN 0-373-72010-6
11. Unto the Last Generation by Juanita Coulson, 1975, ISBN 0-373-72011-4
12. The King of Eolim by Raymond F. Jones, 1975, ISBN 0-373-72012-2
13. Blake's Progress by Ray Nelson, 1975, ISBN 0-373-72013-0
14. Birthright by Kathleen Sky, 1975, ISBN 0-373-72014-9
15. The Star Web by George Zebrowski, 1975, ISBN 0-373-72015-7
16. Kane's Odyssey by Jeff Clinton, 1976, ISBN 0-373-72016-5
17. The Black Roads by J. L. Hensley, 1976, ISBN 0-373-72017-3
18. Legacy by J. F. Bone, 1976, ISBN 0-373-72018-1
19. The Unknown Shore by Donald Malcolm, 1976, ISBN 0-373-72019-X
20. Space Trap by Juanita Coulson, 1976, ISBN 0-373-72020-3
21. A Law for the Stars by John Morressy, 1976, ISBN 0-373-72021-1
22. Keeper by Joan Hunter Holly, 1976, ISBN 0-373-72022-X
23. Birth of Fire by Jerry Pournelle, 1976, ISBN 0-373-72023-8
24. Ruler of the World by J. T. McIntosh, 1976, ISBN 0-373-72024-6
25. Scavenger Hunt by Stephen Goldin, 1976, ISBN 0-373-72025-4
26. To Renew the Ages by Robert Coulson, 1976, ISBN 0-373-72026-2
27. The Horde by Joseph Green, 1976, ISBN 0-373-72027-0
28. The Skies Discrowned by Timothy Powers, 1976, ISBN 0-373-72028-9
29. The Iron Rain by Donald Malcolm, 1976, ISBN 0-373-72029-7
30. The Seeker by David Bischoff with Christopher Lampton, 1976, ISBN 0-373-72030-0
31. Galactic Invaders by James R. Berry, 1976, ISBN 0-373-72031-9
32. Then Beggars Could Ride by Ray Nelson, 1976, ISBN 0-373-72032-7
33. The Dreamfields by K. W. Jeter, 1976, ISBN 0-373-72033-5
34. Seas of Ernathe by Jeffrey Carver, 1976, ISBN 0-373-72034-3
35. I, Aleppo by Jerry Sohl, 1976, ISBN 0-373-72035-1
36. Jeremy Case by Gene DeWeese, 1976, ISBN 0-373-72036-X
37. The Meddlers by J. F. Bone, 1976, ISBN 0-373-72037-8
38. Ice Prison by Kathleen Sky, 1976, ISBN 0-373-72038-6
39. Brandyjack by Augustine Funnell, 1976, ISBN 0-373-72039-4
40. Master of the Stars by Robert Hoskins, 1976, ISBN 0-373-72040-8
41. Future Sanctuary by Lee Harding, 1976, ISBN 0-373-72041-6
42. Cross of Empire by Christopher Lampton, 1976, ISBN 0-373-72042-4
43. Spawn by Donald Glut, 1976, ISBN 0-373-72043-2
44. But What Of Earth? by Piers Anthony and Robert Coulson, 1976, ISBN 0-373-72044-0
45. Finish Line by Stephen Goldin, 1976, ISBN 0-373-72045-9
46. Dance of the Apocalypse by Gordon Eklund, 1976, ISBN 0-373-72046-7
47. Epitaph in Rust by Timothy Powers, 1976, ISBN 0-373-72047-5
48. Rebels of Merka by Augustine Funnell, 1976, ISBN 0-373-72048-3
49. Tiger in the Stars by Zach Hughes, 1976, ISBN 0-373-72049-1
50. West of Honor by Jerry Pournelle, 1976, ISBN 0-373-72050-5
51. Mindwipe! by Steve Hahn, 1976, ISBN 0-373-72051-3
52. The Extraterritorial by John Morressy, 1977, ISBN 0-373-72052-1
53. The Ecolog by Ray Nelson, 1977, ISBN 0-373-72053-X
54. The River and the Dream by Raymond F. Jones, 1977, ISBN 0-373-72054-8
55. Shepherd by Joan Hunter Holly, 1977, ISBN 0-373-72055-6
56. Gift of the Manti by J. F. Bone and Roy Meyers, 1977, ISBN 0-373-72056-4
57. Shadow on the Stars by Robert B. Marcus Jr., 1977, ISBN 0-373-72057-2

== See also ==
- Del Rey Books
