= Spartan Federation =

Spartan Federation is usually a science fiction government:

- Spartan Federation of Sid Meier's Alpha Centauri
- Spartan Federation of Falkenberg's Legion by Jerry Pournelle and S.M. Stirling. It is part of the CoDominium future history series.
