= Alamut series =

Two historical fantasy novels by Judith Tarr

Alamut
- Author: Judith Tarr
- Language: English
- Series: Alamut
- Genre: Fantasy
- Publisher: Doubleday
- Publication date: November 1989
- Publication place: United States
- Media type: Print (hardback & paperback)
- Pages: 470 pp (first edition, hardback)
- ISBN: 0-385-24720-6 (first edition, hardback)
- OCLC: 20016460
- Dewey Decimal: 813/.54 20
- LC Class: PS3570.A655 A79 1989
- Followed by: The Dagger and the Cross

The Dagger and the Cross
- Author: Judith Tarr
- Language: English
- Series: Alamut
- Genre: Fantasy
- Publisher: Doubleday
- Publication date: January 1991
- Publication place: United States
- Media type: Print (hardback & paperback)
- Pages: 474 pp (first edition, hardback)
- ISBN: 0-385-41181-2 (first edition, hardback)
- Preceded by: Alamut

The Alamut series consists of the two fantasy books Alamut (Doubleday, 1989) and The Dagger and the Cross (Doubleday, 1991) by Judith Tarr. The series is set in the same universe as The Hound and the Falcon, which was written first, but the Alamut series describes events which occurred before the events in The Hound and the Falcon.

The books mainly tells the story of the elf Prince Aidan from the elf kingdom of Rhiyana. The books contain elements of historical fiction, being set in the time of the Crusades and covering events like the Battle of Hattin, and including historical figures such as the leper king of Jerusalem Baldwin IV, the Muslim leader Saladin, and the Hashshashin of Alamut.

== Reception ==
Reviewing The Dagger and the Cross, John C. Bunnell stated "Judith Tarr's latest novel combines military strategy, political intrigue, high romance, and subtle magic in a blend that should satisfy devotees of any one of the above." Bunnell also lauded Tarr's characterisation, saying "Everyone has a place in the unfolding intrigues, and no one...is left a mere stereotype in Tarr's capable hands."
