= He Fell into a Dark Hole =

1973 short story by Jerry Pournelle

"He Fell into a Dark Hole" is a science fiction short story by American writer Jerry Pournelle. Set in his CoDominium future alternative history, it was originally published in the magazine Analog Science Fiction and Fact issue of March 1973. The story was reprinted in Warrior: There will be War, Volume V, edited by Pournelle and John F. Carr.

The story tells of a CoDominium spaceship sent on a search and rescue mission. However, the mission becomes complicated due to a natural phenomenon.

== Background ==
The short story is set in the late 21st century. In Pournelle's fictional milieu, this is the era of the CoDominium. The CD is an alliance between the United States of America and the Union of Soviet Socialist Republics, who jointly control Earth and an interstellar empire. To keep their rule over the world, the CoDominium routinely suppresses all scientific research and development. Scientists are censored, spied upon, and can even be deported off Earth.

Interstellar travel is possible thanks to the Alderson Drive. The Drive allows ships to jump to star systems thanks to a fifth force. Stars generate this force, and a pathway for instantaneous travel can be created between stars. However, like many science fiction jump drives, these jumps are limited so a ship can only jump from an Alderson Point, a certain location in space. Ships can only travel from and to these points.

== Plot summary ==
On Ceres, Bartholomew Ramsey, captain of the CDSS Daniel Webster, meets secretly with Vice Admiral Sergei Lermontov. Five years earlier, Ramsey's son and wife Barbara Jean disappeared in space on a passenger liner using a new Alderson point. Several ships were sent to investigate, but they too vanished. Recently, Grand Senator Grant, Barbara Jean's father, had disappeared. He was on a frigate, captained by his nephew, that used the point from which ships never returned. Lermontov needs to find Grant, whose political support could prevent severe cuts in the navy's budget.

However, no one knows why ships keep on disappearing. An illegal physicist named Marie Ward provides an explanation: a black hole. Due to restrictions, research on black holes has not been conducted, and few people are experts on the subject. Alderson jumps work by jumping to the closest star. If an undetected black hole were between two stars, a ship would arrive near the black hole instead. The missing ships could have been trapped by the black hole's gravity.

The Daniel Webster, with Ward aboard, travels to the black hole and finds several of the missing ships. Many of the crews and passengers of the ships are alive, including the Grants and Ramsey's family. Barbara Jean married Commander James Harriman, who has led the survivors for five years.

Ward develops a theory that could allow the Daniel Webster and the survivors to jump out of the system. However, the plan requires a spaceship to go into the black hole. Harriman volunteers and successfully pilots one of the crippled ships into the black hole. The theory works, and the survivors escape to the nearest star.

== Continuity ==
Lermontov and the Grants make other appearances in the Falkenberg's Legion books, playing important roles throughout the series.

The story title is a reference to a variant of the nursery song "The Bear went over the Mountain."
