= The Golden Horn (novel) =

1985 novel by Judith Tarr

- Author: Judith Tarr
- Language: English
- Series: The Hound and the Falcon
- Genre: Fantasy
- Publication date: 1985
- Preceded by: The Isle of Glass
- Followed by: The Hounds of God

The Golden Horn is the second novel in The Hound and the Falcon trilogy by Judith Tarr, published in 1985.

== Plot summary ==
The Golden Horn is a novel in which the half-elven monk named Alf becomes involved in the siege of Constantinople during the Fourth Crusade.

== Reception ==
Wendy Graham reviewed The Golden Horn for Adventurer magazine and stated that "It was all a bit in the classic love story mould of 'we all know they love each other but they don't until the last few pages'."

Dave Langford reviewed The Golden Horn for White Dwarf #86, and stated that "an elegant Georgette Heyer romance moved back in time".

== Reviews ==
- Review by Phyllis J. Day (1986) in Fantasy Review, January 1986
- Review by Don D'Ammassa (1986) in Science Fiction Chronicle, #79 April 1986
- Review by Mary Frances Zambreno (1986) in American Fantasy, Fall 1986
- Review by Chris Barker (1987) in Vector 136
