= Coalsack Nebula =

Dark nebula in the constellation Crux

Dark nebula
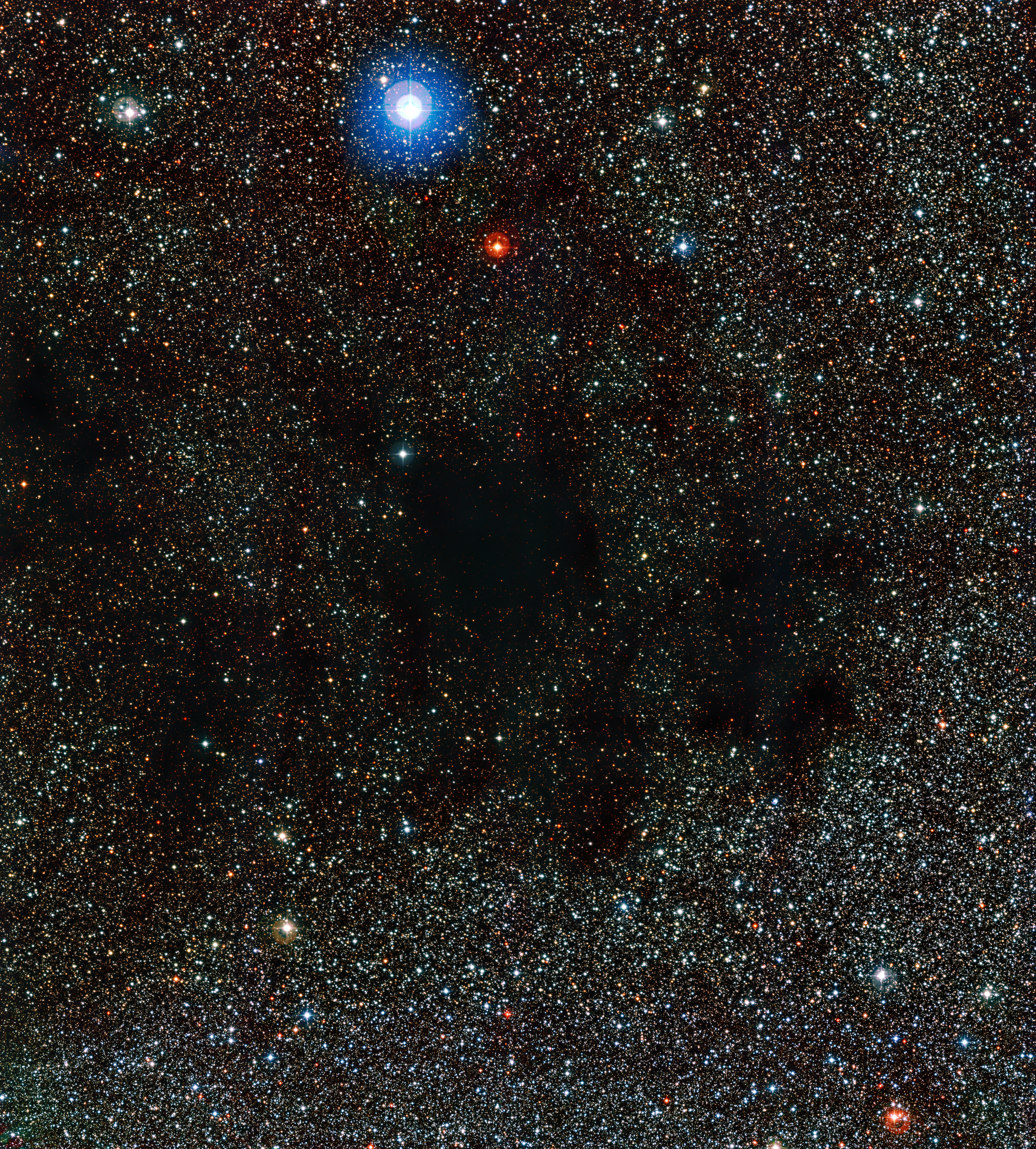
- The Coalsack Nebula, taken by the Wide Field Imager on the MPG/ESO 2.2-metre telescope

Observation data: J2000.0 epoch
- Right ascension: 12^{h} 50^{m}
- Declination: −62° 30′
- Distance: 587 ly (180 pc)
- Apparent magnitude (V): –
- Apparent dimensions (V): 7° × 5°
- Constellation: Crux

Physical characteristics
- Radius: 30–35 ly
- Absolute magnitude (V): –
- Notable features: –
- Designations: Caldwell 99

The Coalsack Nebula (Southern Coalsack, or simply the Coalsack) is a dark nebula, which is visible to the naked eye as a dark patch obscuring part of the Milky Way east of Acrux (Alpha Crucis) in the constellation of Crux.

== General information ==
The Coalsack Nebula covers nearly 7° by 5° and extends into the neighboring constellations Centaurus and Musca. The first observation by a European was reported by Vicente Yáñez Pinzón in 1499. It was named "il Canopo fosco" (the dark Canopus) by Amerigo Vespucci and was also called "Macula Magellani" (Magellan's Spot) or "Black Magellanic Cloud" in opposition to the Magellanic Clouds. The Coalsack is traditionally recognized as a dark constellation by many cultures.

Historically any other dark cloud in the night sky was called a "coalsack". Richard Hinckley Allen in 1899 called a different dark nebula in Cygnus the Northern Coalsack.

A depiction of the emu in the sky known as weitj. The weitj in the sky is male, and you can see them guarding their eggs. During Makuru (the coldest and wettest time of the year, that falls across June and July), which is an Australian Aboriginal constellation consisting of dark clouds rather than of stars. The European constellation on the right is Crux, or the Southern Cross, and on the left is Scorpius. The head of the emu is the Coalsack.

In Australian Aboriginal astronomy, the Coalsack forms the head of the emu in the sky in several Aboriginal cultures. The emu has different names in different Aboriginal languages; for example, a Gamilaraay name is Gawaargay, and a Wergaia name is Tchingal. Amongst the Wardaman people, it is said to be the head and shoulders of a law-man watching the people to ensure they do not break traditional law. According to a legend reported by W. E. Harney, this being is called Utdjungon and only adherence to the tribal law by surviving tribe members could prevent him from destroying the world with a fiery star. There is also a reference by Gaiarbau (1880) regarding the coalsacks replicating bora rings on Earth. These astronomical sites allowed the spirits to continue ceremony similar to their human counterparts on Earth. As bora grounds are generally located on the compass points north–south, the southern coal sack indicates the ceremonial ring.

In Inca astronomy this nebula was called Yutu, after a partridge-like South American bird, the tinamou. (See also Andean dark constellations.)

On the Indonesian island of Bali, it is called Bubu Bosor, a leaky fish trap.

== In popular culture ==
The Coalsack Nebula appeared in Kenji Miyazawa's story Night on the Galactic Railroad, where the protagonist, Giovanni, experiences his friend, Campanella, departing to his personal afterlife referred to as "True Heaven" where he sees his dead mother waiting for him. Giovanni is unable to see True Heaven, and is represented, instead, as the empty, black Coalsack to Giovanni.

The Coalsack Nebula and the galactic area surrounding it played a large role in Jerry Pournelle's CoDominium Universe, particularly The Mote in God's Eye and the sequel The Gripping Hand, both co-authored with Larry Niven. In these novels, a human-colonized system, New Caledonia, is on the opposite side of the Coalsack from Earth. Set against the Coalsack is a red supergiant, and between the supergiant and New Caledonia is a yellow F6 star, known as "The Mote in God's Eye".

== Gallery ==
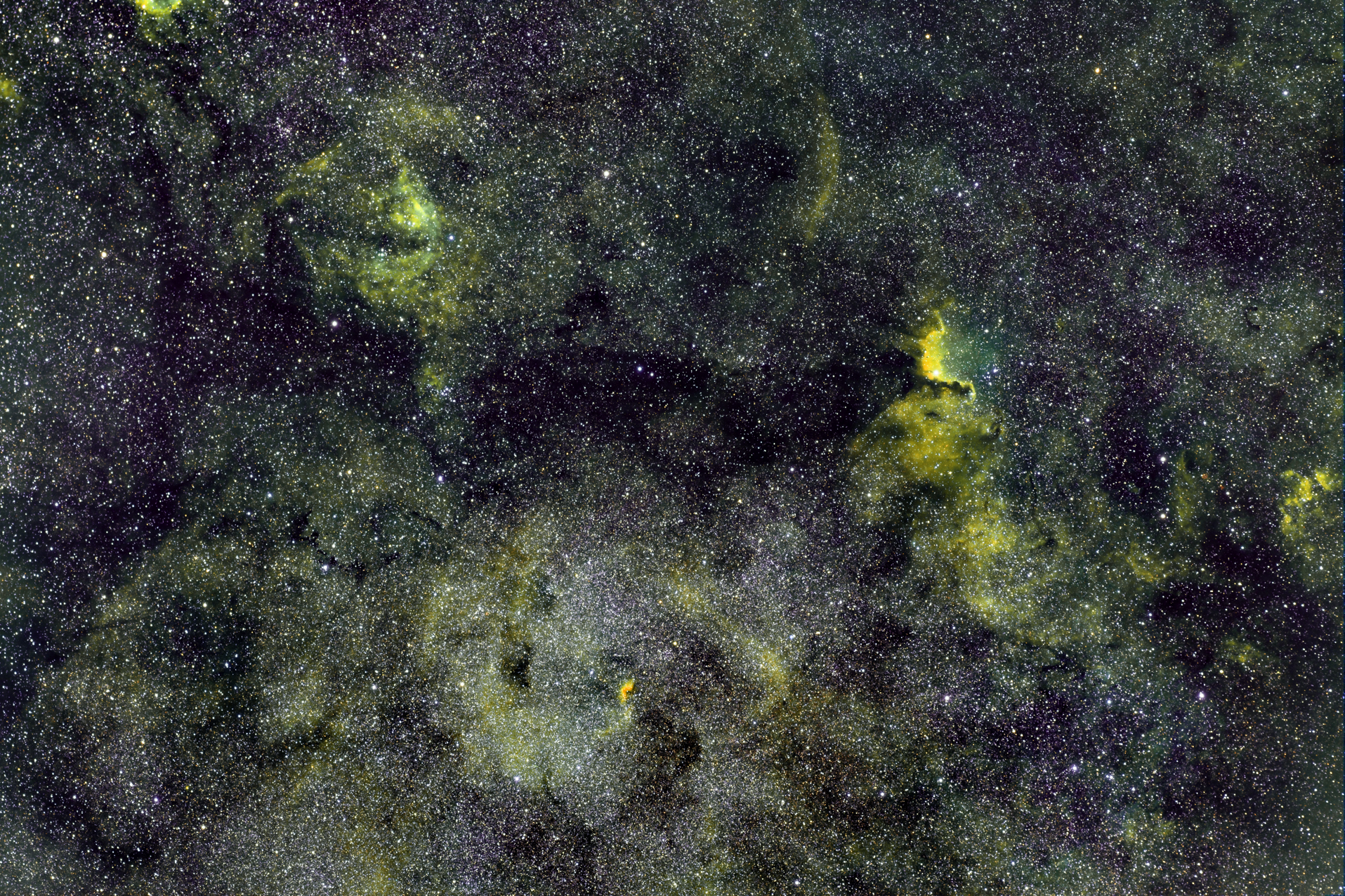
Coal Sack Nebula

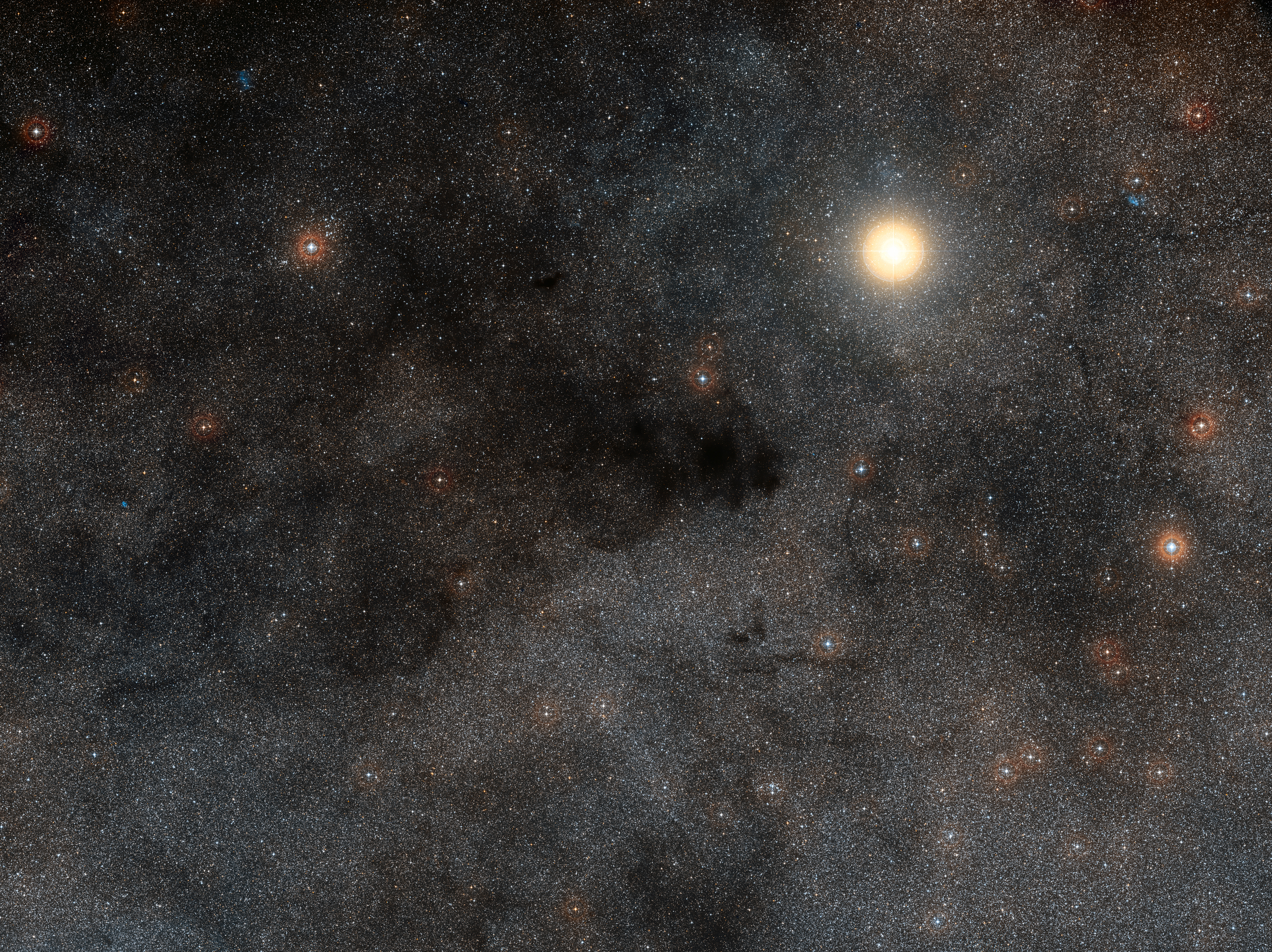
Coalsack Nebula and bright star Acrux
