= The Mote in God's Eye =

1974 novel by Larry Niven and Jerry Pournelle

- First edition (hardcover)
- Author: Larry Niven; Jerry Pournelle
- Language: English
- Series: CoDominium
- Genre: Science fiction
- Publisher: Simon & Schuster
- Publication date: 1974
- Publication place: United States
- Media type: Print (hardback & paperback)
- Pages: 537
- ISBN: 0-671-21833-6
- OCLC: 934734
- Dewey Decimal: 813/.5/4
- LC Class: PZ4.N734 Mo PS3564.I9
- Followed by: The Gripping Hand

The Mote in God's Eye is a science fiction novel by American writers Larry Niven and Jerry Pournelle, first published in 1974. The story is set in the distant future of Pournelle's CoDominium universe, and charts the first contact between humanity and an alien species. The title of the novel is a reference to the Biblical "The Mote and the Beam" parable and is the nickname of a star. The Mote in God's Eye was nominated for the Hugo, Nebula and Locus Awards in 1975.

== Setting ==
The Mote in God's Eye (originally titled Motelight) is set in Pournelle's CoDominium universe, where a union of the United States and the Soviet Union produced a world government and a number of colonies in other star systems, followed by nuclear war on Earth and the rise of the First Empire based on the planet Sparta several centuries before the events of the novel. There is a reference to these events in Pournelle's novel King David's Spaceship.

Many, but not all, humans are part of the Second Empire, held together by an interstellar navy modeled on 19th century British lines, with all-male crews, a highly competent officer corps grown from midshipmen recruited in their teens and trained on the job, and well-armed, well-organized Marines to carry out ground missions. Those who prove themselves worthy can be promoted into the aristocracy. The aristocrats themselves tend more towards duty than privilege. The Empire is predominantly Christian, but other religions are more or less tolerated. The people of the planet Dayan are Jewish, while Horace Bury is a Muslim business magnate from Levant. An upstart religion, the "Church of Him", which was founded when the Mote became intensely bright and was regarded as part of the Face of God, is shown in decline, its founder having committed suicide when the light from the Mote went out.

The Second Empire sees its mission as uniting humanity into one government to prevent war. But in service of this mission, the empire is capable of extreme brutality; it has sterilized a planet to prevent rebellion.

== Plot summary ==
In the year 3017, humanity is slowly recovering from an interstellar civil war that tore apart the first Empire of Man. The Second Empire is busy establishing control over the remnants left by its predecessor, by force if necessary. The Alderson Drive enables ships to travel instantaneously between "Alderson points" in specific star systems.

After a rebellion on the planet New Chicago is quashed, Captain Bruno Cziller of the Imperial battlecruiser INSS MacArthur remains behind as Chief of Staff to the new governor, while Commander Roderick Blaine is given temporary command of the ship, along with secret orders to take Horace Hussein Bury, a powerful interstellar merchant suspected of instigating the revolt, to the Imperial capital, Sparta. Another passenger is Lady Sandra "Sally" Bright Fowler, the niece of an Imperial senator and a traumatized former prisoner of the rebels.

New Caledonia is the capital of the Trans-Coalsack sector, on the opposite side of the Coalsack Nebula from Earth. Also in the sector is a red supergiant star known as Murcheson's Eye. Associated with it is a yellow Sun-like star, which from New Caledonia appears in front of the Eye. Since some see the Eye and the Coalsack as the face of God, the yellow star is known as the Mote in God's Eye.

Approaching New Caledonia, MacArthur is ordered to investigate when an alien spacecraft, propelled by a solar sail, is detected. After the spacecraft fires upon MacArthur, Blaine has its main capsule detached from the sail and taken aboard at great risk to his ship and crew. Its sole occupant, a brown and white furred creature, is found dead.

After much debate, MacArthur and the battleship Lenin are sent to the star from which the alien ship came, the Mote. MacArthur carries civilian researchers to make first contact with the aliens, quickly nicknamed "Moties". Admiral Kutuzov, aboard Lenin, has strict orders to avoid all contact with the aliens and ensure that human technology does not fall into their hands. The Moties seem friendly and have advanced technology that they are willing to trade, much to Bury's delight. Although they also possess the Alderson Drive, none of their spacecraft using it have ever returned. This is because, unknown to the Moties, the Mote's only Alderson exit point lies within the outer layers of the star Murcheson's Eye. Human warships can survive there for a limited time because of their protective Langston Fields, which the Moties do not have.

The Moties are an old species, native to a planet that the humans label Mote Prime, that has evolved into many specialized subspecies. The first taken aboard MacArthur is an "Engineer", possessing amazing technical abilities, but limited speech and free will. It brings along a pair of tiny "Watchmakers" as helpers. Some days later, a delegation of "Mediators" (like the dead pilot of the probe ship) arrive. Their specialty is communication and negotiation. The Mediators invite the humans to send a party to Mote Prime. After some debate, the invitation is accepted. Each person in this group acquires a "Fyunch(click)", a Mediator who studies their human subject and tries to learn how to think like them.

Back on MacArthur, the Watchmakers escape, and although it is assumed they have died, they have actually been breeding furiously out of sight. Undetected by the crew, they modify parts of MacArthur to suit their needs. When they are discovered, a battle for control of the ship erupts. The crew is eventually forced to abandon ship after suffering casualties. The party on Mote Prime is quickly recalled without explanation and told to rendezvous with Lenin. Once MacArthur is evacuated, Lenin fires on and destroys her to prevent the potential capture of human technology.

During the evacuation, MacArthur midshipmen Staley, Whitbread and Potter are cut off and forced to escape in Watchmaker-modified lifeboats. The lifeboats automatically land in a sparsely populated area of Mote Prime. There the midshipmen find a fortified museum. It provides evidence of a very long and violent history, though the Moties had carefully portrayed themselves as completely peaceful. Following this discovery, the midshipmen are tracked down by Whitbread's Mediator Fyunch(click), who reveals that Moties (other than the short-lived, sterile Mediators) must become pregnant periodically or die. This inevitably results in overpopulation ... and civilization-ending wars. The Masters, whom the Mediators obey, have also concealed the existence of one Motie subspecies from the humans: Warriors more deadly than any human, even Sauron supersoldiers.

The museums exist to help restore civilization after a collapse. The "Cycles" of civilization, war, and collapse have gone on for hundreds of thousands of years, leaving the Moties fatalistically resigned to their destiny. Only a mythical character called "Crazy Eddie" believes there is a way to change this, and any Motie who comes to believe a solution is possible is labeled a "Crazy Eddie" and deemed insane.

The current civilization is a type of industrial feudalism, with coalitions of Masters in control of the planet. One faction, led by "King Peter", wanted to reveal the truth to the humans, but was overruled. Colonization of other planets would inexorably bring about conflict with humans, as the inevitable Motie population explosion would force them to seek to take over human worlds. Nonetheless, the more powerful coalition sees this temporary solution as preferable to the impending collapse. Both factions send Warriors after the midshipmen, one to capture them, the other to rescue them. The stronger group's Warriors trap the midshipmen, but the trio refuse to surrender and die as a result.

Unaware of the midshipmen's fate, Lenin leaves the Mote system, taking with it three ambassadors, a sterile Master and two Mediators, whose mission is to open the galaxy to their species while concealing their terrible secrets.

An Imperial Commission is on the verge of granting colonies to the Moties, but MacArthur Sailing Master/Lieutenant Kevin Renner figures out the truth just in time. It is the passengers on the original probe, deliberately ejected into space, that give the game away. Not only is there a Warrior among the group, but several are visibly pregnant, demolishing any argument about them being statues or religious icons.

The decision is made to gather a battle fleet to either disarm or try to annihilate the Moties. The ambassadors are faced with the extinction of their species, knowing that the Masters would never submit. However, a Mediator comes up with a third option: a blockade of the system's only Alderson exit point. This plan is adopted, over the strenuous opposition of Bury, who views the Moties as the greatest threat humanity has ever faced.

== Characters ==
Commander Roderick "Rod" Blaine
A navy officer and member of an influential aristocratic family, Blaine is promoted to captain of the Imperial battlecruiser INSS MacArthur. On return to New Scotland from the Mote, he is retired from active service and appointed to the Commission charged with negotiating with the Moties.
Lady Sandra "Sally" Bright Fowler
After leaving the Imperial University at Sparta with a master's degree in anthropology, she and a classmate named Dorothy embarked on a trip to study primitive cultures (such as human colonies isolated by the civil war) first hand. They became caught up in the revolution on New Chicago. Dorothy disappeared and Sally was imprisoned in a concentration camp, where she took on a leadership role. Months later, she and her two retainers were rescued by Imperial forces. The niece of an Imperial senator, she is sent home aboard MacArthur, but talks herself onto the expedition to the Mote based on her skills.
His Excellency Horace Hussein Chamoun al Shamlan Bury
An Imperial magnate, Chairman of the Board of Imperial Autonetics, and a leading member of the Imperial Traders Association, Bury instigates the rebellion on New Chicago. The Navy suspects his involvement, so he is made a virtual, though unofficial, prisoner aboard MacArthur, with the intent of sending him to New Sparta to face the judgement of the Imperial Court. Although rich, he is not in a position to bribe Blaine, whose family is even richer. His experiences during the evacuation of MacArthur turn him into an advocate for isolating or even destroying the Moties.
Nabil
Bury's servant, skilled with dagger and poison. Travels with Bury to New Scotland, the Mote, and eventually to Sparta. At Bury's command, he captures two "Watchmaker" Moties and places them in a spacesuit's air tank in suspended animation. Later Bury throws the tank away, having become intensely fearful of Moties.
Commander Jack Cargill
First lieutenant of MacArthur, promoted to executive officer after the battle of New Chicago.
Commander Jock (Sandy) Sinclair
MacArthur's chief engineer. Born in New Scotland.
Jonathon Whitbread
A MacArthur midshipman, he becomes the first man to make contact with a living Motie. He has an easygoing personality in contrast to his shipmate Horst Staley. Whitbread is described as being "17 standard years old", slightly younger than the more senior Staley.
Horst Staley
A MacArthur midshipman. Born on the former rebel planet Sauron, he adheres rigidly to naval regulations and the chain of command, and displays no sense of humor. Like the other midshipman, Staley is still in his teens. Despite this, he is put in command of a boarding party of marines ordered to rescue trapped passengers and retrieve Motie technology during the evacuation of MacArthur.
Gavin Potter
A MacArthur midshipman. Born on New Scotland, he joins the crew when MacArthur refuels at a moon of one of the outer planets in the New Caledonia system. Potter serves as the guide to New Scot culture for other characters, particularly the cult known as the Church of Him. He describes the intense light seen coming from the Mote a century earlier, convincing the crew that the incoming probe from there was launched using lasers.
Kevin Renner
The sailing master of MacArthur and former merchant navy officer does not regard himself as a permanent Navy officer. He displays a somewhat irreverent attitude towards the Navy and its traditions while supporting the Imperial Aristocracy style of government.
Admiral Lavrenti Kutuzov
Kutuzov is chosen to command the mission to the Mote because of his ruthless devotion to duty by whatever means are necessary: He once reduced a populated planet to ashes in order to stop a dangerous rebellion against the Empire of Man.
Senator Benjamin Bright Fowler
Sally's uncle, dispatched to New Scotland to meet Lenin on return from the Mote, and head of the Commission to negotiate with Moties.
Father David Hardy
The ship's chaplain aboard MacArthur and an expert linguist, he becomes part of the team that meets the first Motie delegation. Incorrectly regarded as "unworldly", he does not believe everything the Moties say, observing that "priests hear a lot of lies". He is also the first to interpret some Motie communication.
Dr. Anthony Horvath
Minister of Science for Trans-Coalsack sector. Leader of the New Scotland science delegation to the Mote. He advocates for open contact with the Moties, ignorant of any threat they represent.
Dr. Jacob Buckman
An astrophysicist whom Bury cultivates as a source of information about the activities of the rest of MacArthur's crew.
Admiral Plekhanov
Fleet Commander in the Battle of New Chicago, then Acting Governor-General of the recaptured colony.
Bruno Cziller
Captain commanding MacArthur, then Rear-Admiral on Plekhanov's staff on New Chicago, ceding command of his ship to Blaine.

=== Moties ===
Moties are described as bipeds, about 1.3 meters (4 ft 3 in) tall, covered with fur whose color depends on the subspecies. Their most obvious feature is the asymmetric arrangement of arms, with two dexterous right arms and one heavily muscled left arm whose musculature attaches to the head, so that Moties have no left ear to match the large, membrane-like right ear. The backbone is jointed rather than flexible and the entire upper body swivels to turn the head. The face is simple and incapable of expression. Gestures replace facial expression.

Masters have all-white fur, described as silky. Engineers have brown fur, while Mediators, bred of Masters and Engineers, have patchy fur in brown and white and are sterile. Siblings tend to have identical patterns of patches. Masters are obeyed by all other Motie subspecies, though Mediators have some independence to negotiate between Masters. Other Motie subspecies include Warriors, Doctors with extra dexterity, and semi-sentient Farmers who raise crops. Watchmakers are small and have four arms in a symmetrical arrangement.

Moties alternate between sexes as part of their reproductive cycle, except for Mediators who cannot reproduce and have shorter lives. Masters may become sterile males with hormone treatment, at which point they can become Keepers, who preserve resources considered too essential to be fought over.

The Asteroid Miner
After MacArthur appears in the system, the first ship to rendezvous comes from a group of Trojan asteroids related to the only gas giant planet. The pilot is an Engineer. Whitbread boards the Miner's ship and finds it occupied by the Miner and dozens of Watchmakers. The Miner accompanies Whitbread back to MacArthur, bringing two Watchmakers and killing the rest by evacuating her ship's air. The humans are unable to communicate with the Miner, not realizing her status, but discover her ability to improve gadgets. Before the next delegation of Moties arrives, the Miner dies from failing to become pregnant in time. The Watchmakers reproduce in vast numbers and re-make MacArthur under the humans' noses, eventually leading to the ship's evacuation and destruction.
Whitbread's Motie
When the midshipmen land on Mote Prime, Whitbread's Fyunch(click) arrives in an aircraft with Charlie, another Mediator, and an Engineer. Whitbread's Motie serves a Master who was given jurisdiction over interaction with humans, but will kill the midshipmen rather than expose the truth about Moties. At this point all the other Fyunch(click) Mediators are either "Crazy Eddie" or helping their Master. She is instrumental in helping the midshipmen get away from the Museum, explaining their peril to them, and instructing the Brown to work on weapons and transport for them. She kills Whitbread to save him from capture, Whitbread doing the same for Potter while Staley dies fighting. She is later executed in shame for killing her Fyunch(click).
"Charlie"
Charlie is a Mediator whose Master, "King Peter", is willing to protect the midshipmen and send them home. Charlie regards Whitbread's Motie as Crazy Eddie but is willing to work with her to prevent a war. Later Charlie is one of the three Moties sent to negotiate with the humans. It is Charlie who suggests the blockade of the Motie system to prevent the annihilation of her species.
"Ivan"
Ivan is a Keeper, a sterile Master in the male phase who cannot have children and theoretically has no interest in dynastic conflict. Keepers have jurisdiction over vital resources, such as the Museums, used to help rebuild civilization after the inevitable collapse. Ivan is the official ambassador to the Empire.
"Jock"
Jock is a Mediator, the third member of the Motie negotiation team. She is in the first delegation of Moties that meets MacArthur but does not become a Fyunch(click). She serves the same Master as Whitbread's Motie. Her job is to study Kutuzov, the commander of the expedition, but has to do so only indirectly, as Kutuzov is under strict orders to not communicate with the Moties.

== Crazy Eddie ==
The Moties frequently refer to the mythical character they call "Crazy Eddie" when talking to humans. There are many Crazy Eddie stories, but all revolve around the inevitability of repeated cycles of collapse of Motie civilization and the pointlessness of trying to prevent them. The drive that humans call the Alderson Drive, which allows human ships to travel between star systems, is called by Moties the Crazy Eddie Drive, because although it is founded in sound science and has been reinvented many times by Motie civilizations, ships that attempt to use it disappear and are never seen again. The Moties do not know that the ships they send emerge inside the hot photosphere of Murcheson's Eye and are destroyed. Human ships survive this because they are equipped with the energy-absorbing Langston Field. The point in space where the Alderson Drive operates is known to the Moties as the Crazy Eddie Point. This is the title of the second part of the novel. The other parts are titled "The Crazy Eddie Probe", "Meet Crazy Eddie", and "Crazy Eddie's Answer". From the Moties point of view, humans are Crazy Eddie. Several Moties, including Rod Blaine's Fyunch(click), become Crazy Eddie after exposure to human attitudes.

== Reception ==
Robert A. Heinlein, while giving the authors extensive advice on a draft manuscript, described it as "a very important novel, possibly the best contact-with-aliens story ever written". Theodore Sturgeon, writing in Galaxy, described The Mote in God's Eye as "one of the most engrossing tales I have encountered in years", stating that "the overall pace of the book [and] the sheer solid story of it" excuse whatever flaws might remain, with the one complaint being that he found it unlikely the Moties would not have used genetic engineering at some point to curb their population growth.

Portsmouth Times reviewer Terry McLaughlin found the novel "a superior tale, told without the pseudo-psychology background that seems to mar many a new science fiction novel."

Brian W. Aldiss and David Wingrove wrote that while the imagined aliens were "fascinating creations", the "style and characterization [emphasize] the weaknesses of both Niven and Pournelle."

== Awards and nominations ==
- Nominated for the Nebula Award for Best Novel in 1975.
- Nominated for the Hugo Award for Best Novel in 1975.
- Nominated for the Locus Award for Best Science Fiction Novel in 1975.

== Sequels ==
Pournelle and Niven followed up with the sequel The Gripping Hand and in 2010 Pournelle's daughter, Jennifer, published an authorized sequel entitled Outies.

== Other related works ==
60,000 words were cut from the novel before publication.

The short story "Reflex" was instead published in 1983 in the first There Will Be War collection, edited by Pournelle and John F. Carr. It details an early phase of the battle for New Chicago, told from the rebels' point of view. MacArthur, with Captain Cziller in command and Blaine as executive officer, engages and defeats a rebel ship, but because of the technology, particularly the Langston Field, the ship is still deadly and surrender is a complex matter. Midshipman Horst Staley is sent to board and disable the ship while carrying a suicide bomb to prevent interference. He makes a mistake, allowing the "political officer" aboard the ship to snatch away the bomb, but the crew who are sick of the revolt overpower the officer. This preys on his mind during the events of the main novel. The rebel ship is taken as a prize, renamed Defiant, and commanded by Blaine during the final battle.

"Motelight" was also originally written as part of the novel, but was never published except as part of the non-fiction piece "Building 'The Mote in God's Eye'" that appeared in Pournelle's collection "A Step Farther Out". It describes how two astronomers on the planet New Scotland try to continue their work during the war with neighboring New Ireland, and are thus the first to see the sudden brightening of the Mote due to the laser launch system being activated. The rest of the population are hiding under the Langston Fields protecting their cities from bombardment, until one day the field fails and they see the Coal Sack with a glowing green Eye. The story also mentions "Howard Grote Littlemead", who believes that the bright Mote is really the Eye of God, and founds the Church of Him. It is in one of the churches that Potter shows Renner and Staley a holographic picture of the Coal Sack showing the intense green glow of the Mote.

Larry Niven also wrote a poem, "In Memoriam: Howard Grote Littlemead", that was published much later.
