= High Justice =

1974 collection of science fiction short stories by Jerry Pournelle

- First edition
- Author: Jerry Pournelle
- Cover artist: Ed Soyka
- Language: English
- Series: CoDominium
- Genre: Science fiction
- Publisher: Pocket Books
- Publication date: May 1977
- Publication place: United States
- Media type: Print (paperback)
- Pages: 222 pp.
- ISBN: 0-671-81104-5
- OCLC: 3025130
- Followed by: Exiles to Glory

High Justice is a 1974 collection of science fiction short stories by American writer Jerry Pournelle. It was republished in an omnibus edition with Exiles to Glory in 2009 as Exile—and Glory. In the stories, Earth's civilization is about to collapse under the weight of its bureaucracies and political corruption, but a new spacefaring civilization is being built by determined, technologically-sophisticated multinational corporations. Each short story concerns itself with the problems facing large technological tasks in the near future. The protagonists are the agents of multinational corporations—engineers engaged in large scale projects and fixers who protect company interests and troubleshoot problems.

== Setting ==
A major part of the background of these stories is the final fall of the Welfare States; Russia is never mentioned, and the US is downsliding due to inflation and political corruption. The stories were published between 1972 and 1975, and reflect Pournelle's concerns with the effects of environmentalism, welfare states, and high taxes on the ability of people to make advances in technology. At that time the Great Society, America's version of the Welfare State, was not even 10 years old.

Each short story concerns itself with the problems facing large technological tasks in the near future. These include plutonium fuel breeding, deep sea thermal power, large scale food cultivation and access to fresh water. The protagonists are the agents of multinational corporations—engineers engaged in large scale projects and fixers who protect company interests and troubleshoot problems. Though economic competitors are mentioned in passing, the primary antagonists are political—untrustworthy governments and covert operatives acting on their behalf.

Pournelle's view of corporate mega-projects is similar to that of Robert A. Heinlein as expressed in stories such as The Man Who Sold the Moon, or in the work of Tom Clancy. Top executives concentrate on financial risk, while highly competent engineers on the ground handle logistics. Incompetent engineers get fired. There are no meddling vice presidents, craven middle managers or "deadwood" bureaucracy that is generally found in any large technical effort—mostly because Pournelle's corporations lack trade unions.

The projects described in these stories reflect technologies described in Pournelle's non-fiction collection, "A Step Farther Out":

- A laser launch system for sending cargo into orbit, with magnetohydrodynamics (MHD) power generators based on rocket engines.
- The NERVA nuclear rocket engine project.
- Spacecraft using ion drives traversing the Solar System.
- Asteroid mining.
- Ocean thermal power generation with fish farming as a by-product of the artificial upwelling of cold nutrient-rich water from the deep ocean.

The short novel Exiles to Glory is a sequel, featuring two characters from these stories. Another short novel, Birth of Fire, is considered by the author to also be part of this universe, and has similar themes, though it draws more from the author's military SF. Pournelle also had plans to add a story he called "Lisabetta" to this series.

The stories are part of Pournelle's CoDominium universe, a future history stretching to the early 31st century. The themes of decay in the rich democracies are the same. The technology excludes innovations like the Langston field and the Alderson drive, which are the main driving forces in the human diaspora projected for the 21st century. The publisher makes the claim that these are the stories that "started it all", but Pournelle himself considers it a separate "no FTL" universe.

== Stories ==
- "A Matter of Sovereignty": The Nuclear General Company has to go to Tonga to set up its breeder reactors, as strict US regulations make it infeasible. Some large-scale fish farming is a by-product, as is a sanctuary for some of the last blue whales on Earth. But there is always somebody looking to grab a piece of the action; Fiji has impounded a shipload of plutonium, not to mention a lot of Tongan fishing boats, and Chileans want large payments to let icebergs be towed through their waters. The US Navy won't intervene against a small power to protect big business, and the Japanese are about to foreclose on the project and make sushi out of the whales. To solve this problem, the Nuclear General Company gets Tonga to agree to let them use Tonga as a "flag of convenience" for the firm's fleet of armed, nuclear-powered naval vessels.
- "Power to the People": Nuclear General Company tows an iceberg to the coast of Namibia, builds a huge facility to process seawater with nuclear reactors and makes the desert bloom. But a U.S.-born Black revolutionary leader over the border has built his power on promises to address poverty and populism. He demands food and power from Nuclear General Company for the people. Not his real motive, of course. But you can always take him at his word, even if the people don't get the kind of power he was thinking of.
- "Enforcer": More icebergs and reactors, this time mining the ocean floor off the Malvinas/Falklands Islands. The new military junta in Argentina wants in on the project, never mind what the last Presidente agreed to. Call in INTERSEC, the trans-national enforcer of contracts. When the one holdout on the junta refuses to see reason, it Is time for Plan B. (This story was written before the Falklands War took place.)
- "High Justice": Solicitor General Aeneas Mackenzie cleaned up the corruption in the White House and it cost him his job. Now he is working for the kind of people he crusaded against, who happen to work for his once and future lover, Laurie Jo Hansen, a technology entrepreneur. She owns the Hansen Corporation, which is active in space travel and many other fields, and she has a lot of power. Power and money can still get humans into space, even if the government, with its stultifying regulations, can't, or won't. But when the Agency starts committing murder on a space facility to sabotage the effort, Laurie Jo Hansen sends Aeneas Mackenzie into space to find the murderer and bring them to frontier-style justice.
- "Extreme Prejudice": Gideon Starr, a CIA hitman, is sent to the undersea Danforth Station facility to kill Hank Shields, a rogue CIA agent who Agency leaders view as a traitor. It ought to be simple for Gideon, an experienced hitman who has done much harder assassinations. But when Gideon meets Hank, his wife, and his son, and sees how committed Hank is to ensuring the future of humanity, by working on the undersea food projects and training dolphins, he has trouble going through with the mission.
- "Consort": Aeneas Mackenzie has the ship Valkyrie ready to leave Earth orbit and go to the Moon. The Lunatic advance party is already on the ground preparing the site for the colony. But getting the NERVA rocket engine into orbit, along with Laurie Jo, requires one last deal with the devil. A corrupt President masquerading as an honest populist is the only one who can help them. He is also the one who fired Aeneas for purging half the White House. Thanks to Laurie Jo he is being hounded in the media. Laurie Jo can promise to call off her dogs if he delivers, and leave Earth forever to boot. But the President is more afraid of Aeneas Mackenzie, once his oldest friend, than he is of her.
- "Tinker": An patched-together ion drive space tug is the only spaceship able to rendezvous with a disabled ship carrying valuable cargo and 1,700 passengers. That it happens to be in the right place at the right time, with the right fuel on hand, turns out to be the pivot on which the whole story turns. A Hansen Corporation agent is on the job, however. (Incidentally, this story ends the collection on what could be considered a sour note. The rest of the stories were set on Earth, where the governments got their way and the multinationals had to scramble to succeed. This final story is set solely in space, where the multiplanetaries rule—and they are never going to let a government rise to challenge them. The corporate fixer unilaterally punishes the political antagonists, and complaints are made that only those employed by the multiplanetary corporations will prosper from that point on. In short, democracy has failed—human civilization is now feudal, run by the corporations.)
