= The Hound and the Falcon =

Fantasy novel trilogy by Judith Tarr

Book cover

The Hound and the Falcon is a fantasy book trilogy by Judith Tarr, containing the books The Isle of Glass (Bluejay, 1985), The Golden Horn (Bluejay, 1985), and The Hounds of God (Bluejay, 1986).

The books tell the story of the elf Alf, who grew up as a monk in a monastery among humans, and how he meets love and comes to terms with who he is. The books contain elements of historical fiction, including the Sack of Constantinople in the Fourth Crusade.

The Alamut series is set in the same universe, and takes place before the events of The Hound and the Falcon. King Gwydion and Prince Aidan of the elf-kingdom Rhiyana, minor characters in The Hound and the Falcon, are two of the main characters in the Alamut series.

== Reception ==
Reviewing The Isle of Glass, John C. Bunnell stated, "Judith Tarr has written a strikingly thoughtful novel". Bunnell added, "It's a rare book that can blend a challenging tale of character study with a taut, suspenseful saga of fast-paced intrigue and adventure, but The Isle of Glass balances the two elements with singular effectiveness".
