= Susan Shwartz =

American author (born 1949)

- Born: December 31, 1949 (age 76)
- Education: Mount Holyoke College (BA); Harvard University (PhD)
- Occupation: Author

Susan Shwartz (born December 31, 1949) is an American author.

== Education and career ==
She received her B.A. in English from Mount Holyoke College in 1972 and a PhD in English from Harvard University.

Shwartz's Heirs to Byzantium trilogy – Byzantium's Crown (1987), The Woman of Flowers (1987) and Queensblade (1988) is an alternate history series. The Heirs to Byzantium novels are set in a world where Marc Antony defeats Octavius in the Battle of Actium, and joins with Cleopatra to make Byzantium capital of the Roman Empire.

Shwartz's novel The Grail of Hearts (1992) is a fantasy that features the Holy Grail. It also features a sympathetic version of Kundry from Richard Wagner's opera Parsifal; Shwart's Kundry is depicted as a version of the Wandering Jew.

Shwartz has published several novels and sixty short stories.

== Works ==
=== Novels ===
- The Woman of Flowers (1987)
- Byzantium's Crown (1987)
- Silk Roads and Shadows (1988)
- Queensblade (1988)
- Heritage of Flight (1989)
- Imperial Lady (1989) with Andre Norton
- The Grail of Hearts (1991)
- Empire of the Eagle (1993) with Andre Norton. Historical novel about a group of Romans who flee the Battle of Carrhae and travel to India and China.
- Shards of Empire (1996)
- Cross and Crescent (1997)
- Second Chances (2001)
- Hostile Takeover (2004)

She has also collaborated with science fiction writer (and fellow Mount Holyoke alumna) Judith Tarr on the following works:

- S.M. Stirling – Blood Feuds (1993) (with Judith Tarr and Susan Shwartz and Harry Turtledove (Part of the "War World" sub-series in the "Co-dominium" series, originally created by Jerry Pournelle) and Blood Vengeance (1994) (with Susan Shwartz and Judith Tarr and Harry Turtledove and Jerry Pournelle (Also part of the "War World" sub-series)
- CoDominium – Blood Feuds (1992) Susan Shwartz, S.M. Stirling, Judith Tarr, and Harry Turtledove and Blood Vengeance (1994) Susan Shwartz, S.M. Stirling, Judith Tarr, and Harry Turtledove.

==== Star Trek novels ====
All co-written with Josepha Sherman

- Vulcan's Forge (1997)
- Vulcan's Heart (1999)
- Exodus: Vulcan's Soul Book One (2004)
- Exiles: Vulcan's Soul Trilogy Book Two (2006)
- Epiphany: Vulcan's Soul Trilogy Book Three (2007)

=== Short-stories ===
- Suppose They Gave a Peace... (1992) (collected in Mike Resnick's alternate history anthology Alternate Presidents)
- And the Glory of Them (2002) (collected in Harry Turtledove's alternate history anthology Alternate Generals II)

== Editor, short story collections ==
- Arabesques: More Tales of the Arabian Nights (1988)
- Arabesques II (1989)

== Awards ==
=== Winner ===
- 1996 – San Francisco Chronicle Award for Best Novella
- 1995 (with Mike Resnick) – HOMer Award for Best Novella
- 1993 – San Francisco Chronicle Award for Best Novelette

=== Nominated ===
- 1995: Nebula Award for Best Novella
- 1993: Hugo Award for Best Novelette
- 1992, 1991, 1990: Nebula Award for Best Novelette
- 1989: Philip K. Dick Award
- 1987: Nebula Award for Best Short Story

== See also ==
- The Collected Short Fiction of C. J. Cherryh
- The Enterprise Incident
- Women science fiction authors
