= Judith Tarr =

American fantasy and science writer (born 1955)

- Born: January 30, 1955 (age 71); Augusta, Maine, U.S.

Judith Tarr (born January 30, 1955) is an American fantasy and science fiction author.

== Life ==
Tarr was born in Augusta, Maine on January 30, 1955. She is the daughter of Earle A. Tarr, Jr. (a waterworks manager and salesman of real estate), and Regina (a teacher). She received her B.A. in Latin and English from Mount Holyoke College in 1976, and has an M.A. in Classics from Cambridge University, and an M.A. and PhD in Medieval Studies from Yale University. She taught Latin at Wesleyan University from 1990 to 1993.

She breeds Lipizzan horses at Dancing Horse Farm, her home in Vail, Arizona. The romantic fantasies that she writes under the name Caitlin Brennan feature "dancing horses" modeled on those that she raises.

== The Hound and the Falcon Trilogy ==
Tarr's The Hound and the Falcon trilogy (The Isle of Glass, 1985; The Golden Horn, 1985; The Hounds of God, 1986) is a fantasy trilogy set in twelfth and thirteenth century Europe. The trilogy focuses on a race of Elves with supernatural powers, secretly living in medieval society. The trilogy's main character is Alf, a young monk who is also an Elf. The trilogy features historical personages such as Francis of Assisi and King Richard I as characters.

== Alamut ==
In an interview, Tarr stated that she became interested in the period of the Crusades after hearing the 1971 record album, Music of the Crusades by David Munrow and the Early Music Consort of London. This inspired her to write her novel set in the period of the Crusades, Alamut. Tarr consulted the history books The Crusades Through Arab Eyes by Amin Maalouf and The Assassins: A Radical Sect in Islam by Bernard Lewis, as part of her research for Alamut.

== Epona series ==
Tarr's Epona series of novels (White Mare's Daughter, 1998; The Shepherd Kings, 1999; Lady of Horses, 2000; Daughter of Lir, 2001) is set in prehistoric Europe. The Epona series dramatizes the ideas of archaeologist Marija Gimbutas about a matriarchal society existing in Paleolithic Europe.

== Pseudonyms ==
- Caitlin Brennan, pseudonym used for the White Magic series (The Mountain’s Call and sequels) and House of the Star
- Kathleen Bryan, pseudonym used for the War of the Rose series (The Serpent and the Rose and sequels)

== Bibliography ==
=== Series ===
==== Rhiyana Universe ====
- The Hound and the Falcon series:
  - The Isle of Glass, Bluejay, 1985, ISBN 0-312-94237-0
  - The Golden Horn, Bluejay, 1985, ISBN 0-312-94190-0
  - The Hounds of God, Bluejay, 1986, ISBN 0-312-94218-4
    - The Hound and the Falcon, 1993, ISBN 0-312-85303-3, a collection of the earlier works.
- The Alamut series (set in the Middle East, and in the same universe as The Hound and the Falcon):
  - Alamut, Doubleday, 1989, ISBN 0-385-24720-6
  - The Dagger and the Cross, Doubleday, 1991, ISBN 0-385-41181-2.

==== Avaryan Chronicles ====
- The Hall of the Mountain King, Tor, 1986, ISBN 0-312-94210-9
- The Lady of Han-Gilen, Tor, 1987, ISBN 0-312-94271-0
- A Fall of Princes, Tor, 1988, ISBN 0-312-93063-1
  - Avaryan Rising (omnibus of The Hall of the Mountain King, The Lady of Han-Gilen, and A Fall of Princes), Orb, 1997, ISBN 0-312-86388-8
- Arrows of the Sun, Tor, 1993, ISBN 0-312-85263-0
- Spear of Heaven, Tor, 1994, ISBN 0-312-85543-5
- Tides of Darkness, Tor, 2002, ISBN 0-312-87615-7
  - Avaryan Resplendent (omnibus of Arrows of the Sun, Spear of Heaven, and Tides of Darkness), Tor, 2003, ISBN 0-765-30902-5.

==== The Three Queens ====
- Throne of Isis, Forge, 1994, ISBN 0-312-85363-7 (Historical novel featuring Cleopatra and Mark Antony)
- The Eagle's Daughter, Forge, 1995, ISBN 0-312-85819-1
- Queen of Swords, Forge, 1997, ISBN 0-312-85821-3.

==== Epona ====
- White Mare's Daughter, Forge, 1998, ISBN 0-312-86112-5 (Historical novel set in c. 4500 BC)
- The Shepherd Kings, Forge, June 1999 ISBN 0-312-86113-3
- Lady of Horses, Forge, June 2000, ISBN 0-312-86114-1
- Daughter of Lir, Forge, June 2001, ISBN 0-312-87616-5.

==== Devil's Bargain ====
- Devil's Bargain, Roc, September 2002, ISBN 0-451-45896-6
- House of War, Roc, November 2003, ISBN 0-451-52900-6.

==== William the Conqueror ====
- Rite of Conquest, Roc, November 2004, ISBN 0-451-46002-2
- King's Blood, Roc, October 2005, ISBN 0-451-46045-6.

=== Other novels ===
- A Wind in Cairo, Bantam Spectra, 1989, ISBN 0-553-27609-3
- Ars Magica, Bantam Spectra, 1989, ISBN 0-553-28145-3
- Lord of the Two Lands, Tor, 1993 ISBN 0-312-85362-9 (about Alexander the Great)
- His Majesty's Elephant, Jane Yolen Books, 1993, ISBN 0-15-200737-7 (about Emperor Charlemagne)
- Pillar of Fire, Forge, 1995, ISBN 0-312-85542-7 (Historical novel set in Ancient Egypt)
- King and Goddess, Forge, 1996, ISBN 0-312-86092-7
- Household Gods (with Harry Turtledove), Tor, 1999, ISBN 0-312-86487-6
- Kingdom of the Grail, Roc, September 2000, ISBN 0-451-45797-8 (Fantasy novel where Roland (from the Matter of France) meets Merlin)
- Pride of Kings, Roc, September 2001, ISBN 0-451-45847-8
- Queen of the Amazons, Tor, April 2004, ISBN 0-765-30395-7
- Bring Down the Sun, Tor, 2008, ISBN 978-0-765-30397-4
- Living in Threes, Book View Cafe, 2014, ISBN 978-1-61138-450-5
- Forgotten Suns, Book View Cafe, 2015, ISBN 978-1-611-38491-8

=== Collaborations ===
- CoDominium Universe,
  - War World series
    - Blood Feuds (with S.M. Stirling, Susan Shwartz, and Harry Turtledove), Baen, 1993, ISBN 0-671-72150-X
    - Blood Vengeance (with Jerry Pournelle, S.M. Stirling, Susan Shwartz, and Harry Turtledove), Baen, 1993, ISBN 0-671-72201-8

=== Short fiction ===
Stories

| Title | Year | First published | Reprinted/collected | Notes |
|---|---|---|---|---|
| "Defender of the Faith" | 1985 | Moonsinger's Friends edited by Susan Shwartz | | |
| "Pièce de Résistance" | 1986 | Asimov's Science Fiction, April 1986 | Reprinted in The Year's Best Fantasy Stories: 13 (1987) edited by Arthur W. Saha | |
| Kehailan | 1988 | Arabesques: More Tales of the Arabian Nights edited by Susan Shwartz | | |
| "Falcon Law" | 1989 | Four From the Witch World edited by Andre Norton | | |
| ""Al-Ghazalah" | 1989 | Arabesques 2 edited by Susan Shwartz | | |
| "Roncesvalles" | 1990 | What Might Have Been? Volume 2: Alternate Heroes edited by Gregory Benford and Martin H. Greenberg | Reprinted in The Mammoth Book of Alternate Histories (2010) edited by Ian Whates and Ian Watson. | Short story about the Emperor Charlemagne. |
| "Death and the Lady" | 1992 | After the King: Stories in Honor of J.R.R. Tolkien edited by Martin H. Greenberg | Reprinted in Modern Classics of Fantasy (1997) edited by Gardner Dozois | |
| "Them Old Hyannis Blues" | 1992 | Alternate Kennedys edited by Mike Resnick | | |
| "Queen of Asia" | 1993 | Alternate Warriors edited by Mike Resnick | | |
| "Cowards Die: A Tragicomedy in Several Fits" | 1994 | Alternate Outlaws by Mike Resnick | | |
| "Horizon" | 2002 | Alternate Generals II edited by Harry Turtledove | | |
| "Measureless to Man" | 2005 | Alternate Generals III edited by Harry Turtledove | | |
| "Fool's errand" | 2015 | Tarr, Judith (January–February 2015). "Fool's errand". Analog Science Fiction and Fact. 135 (1&2): 100–111. | | |

=== As Caitlin Brennan ===
- House of the Star, Starscape, 2010, ISBN 978-0-765-32037-7

The White Magic series

1. The Mountain's Call, Luna, 2004, ISBN 0-373-80210-2
2. Song of Unmaking, Luna, 2005, ISBN 0-373-80232-3
3. Shattered Dance, Luna, 2006, ISBN 0-373-80248-X

=== As Kathleen Bryan ===
The War of the Rose series

1. The Serpent and the Rose, Tor, 2007, ISBN 0-765-31328-6
2. The Golden Rose, Tor, 2008, ISBN 978-0-765-31329-4
3. The Last Paladin, Tor, 2009, ISBN 978-0-765-31330-0

== Awards ==
- The Isle of Glass was the winner of the 1987 William Crawford Award
- Short story "Death and the Lady" was second place for the 1993 Theodore Sturgeon Award
- Lord of the Two Lands was nominated in 1994 for the World Fantasy Award for Best Novel and the Locus Award for Best Fantasy Novel

== See also ==
- Women science fiction authors
