= Birth of Fire =

1976 novel by Jerry Pournelle

- First edition, cover artist Kelly Freas
- Author: Jerry Pournelle
- Publisher: Laser Books
- Publication date: 1976

Birth of Fire is a science fiction novel by American writer Jerry Pournelle. It was first published by Laser Books in 1976, and later reprinted by Baen Books. It is related to the books Exiles to Glory and High Justice, and with those two, form a starting point for the CoDominium series.

It is about a gang member, Garrett Pittson, who chooses exile to a Mars colony over imprisonment on Earth. Once arriving on Mars, he joins a farmers' revolution and falls in love with Erica, a young woman.

== Plot ==
The book starts out in a year sometime between 2000 and 2050. It begins with Garrett Pittson, a respected gang member who has not found his path in life, caught in the middle of a gang war and then caught by the police. He is sentenced to prison for twenty years but takes up his lawyer's offer of being shipped out to a colony on Mars where the conditions are rough and the pay is unfair.

Once arriving the events stir up and he ends up playing a prominent role in a revolution led by a group of farmers out on the rim of a large crater in Mars' southern hemisphere. Garrett is noticed as an excellent student by Commander Farr, who tells him to go to the city, and wait for someone to find him. He gets a P-Suit, learns to farm and the two travel to a friend's farm where they meet Erica. Garrett is attracted to her and they kiss, but she says they should wait. After multiple trips, the two spend more time together and fall in love.

== Sources ==
- Pournelle, Jerry. Birth of Fire. 1976 Baen, Wake Forest. (ISBN 067165649X)
