= Pillar of Fire (novel) =

1995 novel by Judith Tarr

- Author: Judith Tarr
- Language: English
- Subject: Egypt--History--Eighteenth dynasty
- Genre: Historical fiction
- Publisher: Forge
- Publication date: 1995
- Pages: 448
- ISBN: 0-312-85542-7
- OCLC: 32088557
- Dewey Decimal: 813/.54 20
- LC Class: PS3570.A655 P55 1995

Pillar of Fire is a 1995 historical fantasy novel by Judith Tarr. It deals with the reigns of Egyptian pharaohs Akhenaten and Tutankhamun and the Exodus from the perspective of a Hittite slave girl of Ankhesenpaaten. It draws heavily on Ahmed Osman's suggestion that Moses and Akhenaten were the same person.

The idea of Akhenaten as the pioneer of a monotheistic religion that later became Judaism has been considered by various scholars starting with Sigmund Freud's views in Moses and Monotheism. Tarr comments in the endnotes that she was surprised at how little she had to tweak historical fact to write the story.

The audiobook version, published in 1998, ran for approximately 22 hours and was read by Anna Fields.

== Synopsis ==
Set in ancient Egypt, the narrative is based on the notion that Moses and the Pharaoh Akhenaten were one and the same. Narrated in the third person from the viewpoint of a Hittite slave girl, the novel juxtaposes the Exodus story with the events in the Egyptian court. Scholars generally do not recognize the biblical portrayal of the Exodus as an actual historical event,

== Awards ==
The novel was a NESFA 1995 Hugo Recommendation.

== Reviews ==
Publishers Weekly said With her usual skill, Tarr (Throne of Isis) combines fact and fiction to create yet another remarkably solid historical novel set in ancient Egypt... This is a highly entertaining blend of romance, drama and historical detail."

Kirkus Reviews said that "The small but telling details of society and everyday life, the heart's-blood of historical fiction, are all too often absent here. Tarr's hard-to-swallow revisionist Exodus ends up neither engaging nor persuasive."

According to Brian M. Britt, who revers to Akhenaten as "quasi-monotheistic, "Tarr's novel represents the most dramatic connection between the Amarna phase of Egyptian history and Hebrew monotheism."
