= The Gripping Hand =

1993 novel by Larry Niven and Jerry Pournelle

- First edition
- Author: Larry Niven; Jerry Pournelle
- Cover artist: Lee MacLeod
- Language: English
- Series: CoDominium
- Genre: Science fiction
- Publisher: Pocket Books
- Publication date: Feb 1993
- Publication place: United States
- Pages: 401
- ISBN: 0-671-79573-2
- Preceded by: The Mote in God's Eye
- Followed by: Outies

The Gripping Hand is a science fiction novel by American writers Larry Niven and Jerry Pournelle, published in 1993. A sequel to their 1974 work The Mote in God's Eye, The Gripping Hand is, chronologically, the last novel to be set in the CoDominium universe (though in 2010 Pournelle's daughter Jennifer published an authorized sequel entitled Outies). In the United Kingdom, it was released as The Moat around Murcheson's Eye (sometimes misspelled "The Mote around Murchison's Eye").

The Gripping Hand is set in the year 3046 (twenty-eight years after the events of The Mote in God's Eye) and revolves primarily around two characters of the first book, Captain Sir Kevin Renner (ISN, Reserve) and His Excellency Horace Bury, Imperial Trader Magnate. It also resolves many of the conflicts and tension remaining from the preceding novel, but much of the plot cannot be understood without reading The Mote in God's Eye.

== Plot ==
At the end of The Mote in God's Eye, Renner and Bury are secretly enlisted into Imperial Naval Intelligence. Neither is happy about the arrangement at first, but they spend the next twenty-five years effectively preventing rebellions against the Empire so that the Imperial Navy can concentrate on blockading the Moties in their star system.

While investigating suspicious economic activity on the planet Maxroy's Purchase, Renner and Bury encounter wide idiomatic usage of the phrase "...on the gripping hand". The source of the phrase turns out to be innocuous enough — the governor picked up the expression as a crewman on INSS MacArthur on the expedition to Mote Prime — but the memories dredged up are too much for Bury. Driven by nightmares and a deep-seated fear for humanity's safety, Bury must confirm that the Empire is safe from the Moties. Renner and Bury travel to Sparta, the Imperial capital planet, to obtain permission to inspect the blockade.

In Mote, it is mentioned that a protostar is forming in the Coalsack Nebula. The Moties had studied it extensively and fooled Jacob Buckman, the astrophysicist on the only expedition to the Motie system, into believing that it would ignite in about 1,000 years. Bury and Renner discover, much to their horror, that the object is due to collapse and ignite much sooner. The newborn star will create one or more new Alderson Points for interstellar travel, giving the Moties another usable exit from their system. The sole currently existing Alderson Point leads to inside the photosphere of the supergiant red star Murcheson's Eye, which made the blockade much more practical.

Armed with this knowledge and carrying passengers, Renner and Bury depart aboard Bury's ship Sinbad for New Caledonia, the closest human system to the Mote. There the Imperial Commission decides that ships must be sent to the hitherto ignored star system where the Alderson Point will appear. All that can be sent on such short notice are two Imperial warships and Sinbad.

They arrive — just in time to observe seven unarmed Motie ships emerge from the new Alderson Point. The Moties scatter, and three human ships cannot possibly capture all of them, though they can block the exit. Renner and Bury decide they have no choice but to accept a Mediator's invitation to return with her to the Motie system.

The second half of The Gripping Hand is a tale of shifting alliances involving many Motie factions, diplomacy and space combat. With the aid of the grownup offspring of Lord and Lady Blaine, raised in the company of Mediators brought back by the first expedition, Bury and Renner fight to save the Empire. Key to their strategy is a genetically altered parasite developed by the Blaines' research institute. It limits the excessive reproduction rate that has condemned the Moties to Cycles of overpopulation, followed inevitably by war and the collapse of civilization. Two alliances coalesce, one in favor of peaceful co-existence with humans and another determined to escape the Motie system at any cost. The pro-human faction wins.

== Reception ==
James Nicoll considered the novel to be an "utterly unnecessary sequel", "unmemorable", and "rather dull", with "[t]oo much irrelevant wheel spinning"; Nicoll also singled out "the entire Maxroy’s Purchase subplot" as superfluous.

Publishers Weekly described it as "perfectly adequate [but] largely irrelevant", noting that "the first third of the book drags" and that Niven and Pournelle "don't explore [the book's themes and subtexts] deeply enough." Kirkus Reviews called it "sometimes slow-paced and talky", but felt that readers would not be disappointed, and predicted that the book would be a finalist for the Hugo Award for Best Novel. (It was not.)

== Background ==
In his 1991 collection Playgrounds of the Mind, Niven stated that he and Pournelle were contractually forbidden from collaborating on any projects until they had completed a sequel to The Mote in God's Eye.
