= The Hounds of God =

Novel published in 1986

The Hounds of God is a fantasy novel by American writer Judith Tarr, published in 1986. It is the third book in The Hound and the Falcon trilogy.

== Plot summary ==
The Hounds of God is a novel in which the elite class of elves suffer from religious discrimination.

== Reception ==
Dave Langford reviewed The Hounds of God for White Dwarf #92, stating that "all a bit reminiscent of Kurtz's Deryni books, but Tarr is the better writer."

== Reviews ==
- Review by Faren Miller (1986) in Locus, #301 February 1986
- Review by Charles de Lint (1986) in Science Fiction Review, Summer 1986
- Review by Don D'Ammassa (1986) in Science Fiction Chronicle, #87 December 1986
- Review by Charles de Lint (1987) in Fantasy Review, March 1987
- Review by Chris Barker (1987) in Vector 140
- Review by Andy Sawyer (1988) in Paperback Inferno, #72

== Awards and nominations ==
Year	Award	Result	Ref.
1987	Locus Award for Best Fantasy Novel	25	
