= Household Gods (novel) =

1999 novel by Harry Turtledove and Judith Tarr

- First edition
- Author: Harry Turtledove and Judith Tarr
- Cover artist: Cynthia von Buhler
- Language: English
- Genre: Science fiction, fantasy, time travel
- Published: 1999 (Tor Books)
- Publication place: United States
- Media type: Print

Household Gods is a 1999 science fiction time-travel novel written by Harry Turtledove and Judith Tarr.

== Plot summary ==
The story follows Nicole Gunther-Perrin, a young lawyer in late 20th-century Los Angeles who is dissatisfied with her hectic life, balancing her career with motherhood while dealing with her deadbeat ex-husband and sexist coworkers. Believing the past to be a better time, one evening after a particularly distressing day, she makes a wistful plea to a plaque of two Roman gods, Liber and Libera, who take it as a prayer. Unknown to her, the plaque, which she thinks is a tourist copy picked up in Europe on holidays a few years earlier, is actually an ancient relic from the Roman Era. The next morning, she wakes up in the body of one of her ancient ancestors, running a tavern in the 2nd century Carnuntum, in what is now Austria.

In general, she finds out the hard way that life in the past was not quite what she thought it would be: slavery is taken for granted, and there are no women's rights, no effective medicine or clean medical practices, little entertainment, and no tampons. Over the course of six months, she is forced to revise many of her long-held modern prejudices, including those against alcohol and corporal punishment.

She survives epidemic disease (the Antonine Plague) and a Germanic invasion that is part of the Marcomannic Wars. She finds that early Christianity was uncomfortably zealous and apocalyptic. Having managed to avoid rape during the occupation of the city by Germanic "barbarians", she experiences a brutal rape by one of the Roman soldiers who came to liberate the city. Afterwards, she discusses the role of government and its duties to abused citizens with Roman Emperor Marcus Aurelius, who personally headed the Roman military force arriving at Carnuntum.

Eventually, Liber and Libera fulfill her desire to return home. She wakes from a 6-day 'coma' to learn that she could improve her working and family life. Her skills gave her more empathy and self-confidence, and she now appreciated for the life modern conveniences allow. With her new perspective, she could handle the stresses and difficulties of her life.

== Reception ==
Jo Walton has described it as "a well-written book that always annoys the heck out of [her]", because Nicole is "the most irritating person you could ever spend a whole book with". Walton particularly faulted Nicole's lack of curiosity, citing the scene where, after returning to California, Nicole visits a bookstore, discovers that she can still read Latin, and then leaves without trying to learn the fate of anyone she met.
