= Sara Georgini =

American historian

- Education: Boston University
- Occupations: Historian, Series Editor
- Writing career
- Genre: History
- Subjects: American history, religious history
- Notable work: Household Gods: The Religious Lives of the Adams Family

Sara Georgini is an American historian, and series editor for The Papers of John Adams, at the Adams Papers Editorial Project which is headquartered at the Massachusetts Historical Society.

She graduated from Boston University receiving her doctorate in 2016.

Georgini's 2019 book, Household Gods, examines the development of American religious ideas through the lens of John Adams' family. It focuses on white, Protestant religious thought, specifically through the British tradition. She proposes that the family's extensive travel was critical to shaping their religious practice, and that the men of the family were intent on incorporating their family history into the emerging national myth. In reviewing the book, Johnson praises the book's ambition, but criticizes its focus only on the men of the family, and its inaccessibility to non-experts.

Her work has appeared in Smithsonian magazine. She is a member of the Junto, a group blog about the founding of Early America.

== Works ==
- Household Gods: The Religious Lives of the Adams Family (Oxford University Press, 2019). ISBN 9780190882587 Reviews:
  - Howe, Daniel Walker (2020). "Household Gods: The Religious Lives of the Adams Family by Sara Georgini (review)". Journal of the Early Republic. 40 (3): 567–569. doi:10.1353/jer.2020.0076. ISSN 1553-0620.
  - Carté, Katherine (2022). "Household Gods: The Religious Lives of the Adams Family by Sara Georgini (review)". The William and Mary Quarterly. 79 (4): 651–655. doi:10.1353/wmq.2022.0043. ISSN 1933-7698.
  - Kappanadze, Margaret (January 2, 2019). "Household Gods: The Religious Lives of the Adams Family". Library Journal.
