= The Isle of Glass =

1985 novel by Judith Tarr

The Isle of Glass is the first novel in The Hound and the Falcon trilogy by Judith Tarr, published in 1985.

== Plot summary ==
The Isle of Glass is a novel in which the elven hero, Alf, tries to prevent civil war and then begins a pilgrimage to Jerusalem.

== Reception ==
Dave Langford reviewed The Isle of Glass for White Dwarf #80, and stated that "Tarr can actually write. Her spare prose and dialogue give a period flavour without the dread excesses of gadzookery. Moreover, she's clearly a member of the Black Lords Anonymous and the Society for the Abolition of Quest Clichés."

== Reviews ==
- Review by Faren Miller (1985) in Locus, #289 February 1985
- Review by Phyllis J. Day (1985) in Fantasy Review, June 1985

== Awards and nominations ==
Year	Award	Result	Ref.
1986	Locus Award for Best First Novel	11	
