= CoDominium =

Novels by Jerry Pournelle

CoDominium is a series of future history novels written by American scientist and writer Jerry Pournelle, along with several co-authors, such as Larry Niven and S.M. Stirling. CoDominium as a setting diverges from real-life history around 1991 and ends at 3051 AD.

The CoDominium (CD) is a political alliance and union between the United States and the Soviet Union in Pournelle's fictional history. Formed to maintain planetary stability, the CD becomes a de facto planetary government and later an interstellar empire, though it halts scientific and political evolution. The U.S. during the CD era is a welfare state with distinct social classes: Citizens and Taxpayers. The CD eventually collapses in 2103-2104 and is succeeded as galactic hegemon by the First and Second Empires of Man.

Colonies in the CoDominium are established on habitable planets, founded by various groups such as ethnic minorities, religious groups, and businesses. Elite colonies have advanced technology and fleets, allowing them some independence from the CD. Later on in the timeline, the Outies, systems that retained enough technology to pose a threat, serve as a constant challenge for the Imperial Navy. Jennifer R. Pournelle's novel Outies is a sequel that explores themes of alienation and the impact of biology on destiny.

== Series ==
Short stories, novels and compilations featuring CoDominium content
Title	Publication date	Author(s)	Type	Series	Notes
"Peace With Honor"	1971 (May)	Jerry Pournelle	short story	Falkenberg series	later incorporated into The Mercenary
"His Truth Goes Marching On"	1971 (September)	Jerry Pournelle	short story	Falkenberg Series	later incorporated into Prince of Mercenaries
A Spaceship for the King	1971 (December), 1972 (January and February)	Jerry Pournelle	novel (serial)	Moties series	later expanded into King David's Spaceship
"He Fell into a Dark Hole"	1973	Jerry Pournelle	short story	CoDominium series	collected in There Will Be War, Vol. 5 and The Best of Jerry Pournelle
Sword and Scepter	1973	Jerry Pournelle	novel	Falkenberg series	later incorporated into The Mercenary
The Mote in God's Eye	1974	Larry Niven and Jerry Pournelle	novel	Moties series	
"Motelight"	1976	Larry Niven	short story	Moties series	prologue to The Mote in God's Eye
Birth of Fire	1976	Jerry Pournelle	novel	CoDominium series	
West of Honor	1976	Jerry Pournelle	novel	Falkenberg series	later incorporated into Falkenberg's Legion
The Mercenary	1977 (February)	Jerry Pournelle	novel (fix-up)	Falkenberg series	later incorporated into Falkenberg's Legion
"Silent Leges"	1977	Jerry Pournelle	short story	Falkenberg series	later incorporated into Prince of Mercenaries
High Justice	1977 (May)	Jerry Pournelle	anthology	CoDominium series	collected in Exile—and Glory
Exiles to Glory	1978	Jerry Pournelle	novel	CoDominium series	collected in Exile—and Glory
King David's Spaceship	1980	Jerry Pournelle	novel	Moties series	expanded from A Spaceship for the King
"Reflex"	1982	Larry Niven and Jerry Pournelle	short story	Moties series	The cut first chapter of The Mote in God's Eye; collected in There Will Be War, Vol. 1, Infinite Stars, and The Best of Jerry Pournelle
"In Memoriam: Howard Grote Littlemead"	1984	Larry Niven	poem	Moties series	rewrite of "Motelight"
War World, Vol 1: The Burning Eye	1988	various	anthology	War World series	
Prince of Mercenaries	1989	Jerry Pournelle	novel	Falkenberg series	collected in The Prince
Falkenberg's Legion	1990	Jerry Pournelle	novel (fix-up)	Falkenberg series	a compilation of West of Honor and The Mercenary; collected in The Prince
War World, Vol 2: Death's Head Rebellion	1990	various	anthology	War World series	
Go Tell the Spartans	1991	S. M. Stirling and Jerry Pournelle	novel	Falkenberg series	collected in The Prince
War World, Vol 3: Sauron Dominion	1991	various	anthology	War World series	
CoDominium: Revolt on WarWorld	1992 (July)	various	anthology	War World series	
War World: Blood Feuds	1992 (December)	various	novel	War World series	
The Gripping Hand	1993 (January)	Larry Niven and Jerry Pournelle	novel	Moties series	also titled The Moat Around Murcheson's Eye
Prince of Sparta	1993 (March)	S. M. Stirling and Jerry Pournelle	novel	Falkenberg series	collected in The Prince
Exiles to Glory: Revised Edition	1993 (December)	Jerry Pournelle	novel	CoDominium series	revised edition of Exiles to Glory
War World: Blood Vengeance	1994 (January)	various	novel	War World series	
War World, Vol 4: Invasion	1994 (August)	various	anthology	War World series	
The Prince	2002	S.M. Stirling and Jerry Pournelle	omnibus	Falkenberg series	a compilation of Prince of Mercenaries, Falkenberg's Legion, Go Tell the Spartans, Prince of Sparta, and exclusive bonus content
War World: The Battle of Sauron	2007	John F. Carr and Don Hawthorne	novel	War World series	an expanded version was printed in ebook form in 2013
Exile—and Glory	2008	Jerry Pournelle	omnibus	CoDominium series	a compilation of High Justice and Exiles to Glory
Outies	2010 (April)	J.R. Pournelle	novel	Moties series	
War World: Discovery	2010 (August)	various	anthology	War World series	
War World: Takeover	2011	various	anthology	War World series	
War World: Jihad!	2012	John F. Carr	anthology	War World series	
War World: The Lidless Eye	2013 (January)	John F. Carr and Don Hawthorne	novel	War World series	
War World: The Battle of Sauron – 2nd Edition	2013 (February)	John F. Carr and Don Hawthorn	novel (reissued with new material)	War World series	expanded ebook version of War World: The Battle of Sauron
War World: Cyborg Revolt	2013 (August)	John F. Carr and Don Hawthorne	novel	War World series	
War World, Vol 1: The Burning Eye – 2nd Edition	2015	various	anthology (reissued with new material)	War World series	
War World: The Patriotic Wars	2017	various (edited by John F. Carr)	anthology	War World series	
War World: Falkenberg’s Regiment	2018	John F. Carr	novel	War World series	
War World: The Fall of the CoDominium	2019	various (edited by John F. Carr)	anthology	War World series	
War World: Andromeda Flight	2021	Doug McElwain (edited by John F. Carr)	novel	War World series	
War World: Road Warriors	2022	various (edited by John F. Carr)	anthology	War World series	
War World: The Falkenberg Protectorate	2023	Various	novel	War World series	

== Setting ==
=== Formation of the CoDominium ===
The point of departure of Pournelle's history is the establishment of the CoDominium (CD), a political alliance and later union between the United States of America and a revitalized Soviet Union. This union, achieved in the name of planetary stability, reigns over the Earth for over a hundred years. In that time, it achieves peace of a sort, as well as interstellar colonization, but at the price of a complete halt in both scientific and political evolution.

The CoDominium (CD) is a supranational alliance of the United States of America and the Union of Soviet Socialist Republics. This alliance eventually becomes a de facto planetary government, and later, an interstellar empire. Despite this, no other nations on Earth are given representation or membership. Other major powers become mere client states. It is governed by a "Grand Senate", which is composed of Senators chosen from the two superpowers. A CoDominium Council exists and appears to function as a judicial branch. The CD did not unify the United States and the USSR, who appear to retain their separate identities and mutual distrust. The CD was only created for the shared benefit of the two member states. It does not govern either nation, and each state has been allowed to retain their government structures, nationalities, military forces, and to run their own internal affairs.

The United States of the CoDominium Era is a welfare state divided into two social classes: Citizens and Taxpayers. "Citizens" are welfare dependents who are required to live in walled sections of cities called "Welfare Islands." People are given whatever they need, including the drugs like Borloi to keep them pacified. There are no limits to welfare if they want it, except that they must live on a Welfare Island. Although people are free to gain an education and work or become a colonist, many citizens did not, preferring to live their whole lives supported by the government. Generally, citizens are uneducated and illiterate. Some BuReLoc involuntary colonists are Citizens. By the late CD era, the Welfare Islands were three generations old. "Taxpayers" are the working, educated, and privileged middle to the upper class. They carry identification cards to separate them from Citizens.

The Empire is organized by sectors, ruled by a Viceroy who serves as a representative of the Crown. Each sector has its own Council, headed by a Lord President, and its own Parliament. The Imperial government is divided into several ministries, including External Affairs, War, and Science. Some planets are governed by an aristocracy, although at least one member world is a republic.

For the most part, the stars with inhabitable planets in the CoDominium are obscure and unnamed on current star charts. For instance, the world of New Washington and its sister planet Franklin orbit a red dwarf at some distance from the Solar System. Such stars are very common in the galaxy but even the closest ones are too dim to observe without equipment, Proxima Centauri being the obvious example. Other habitable systems in the CoDominium have stars in the stellar classes F, G and K, which are common but dim compared to the named stars in the night sky. One of the few stars explicitly named in the CoDominium stories is 82 Eridani, containing the Meiji colony. Viewed from Earth, 82 Eridani is a star of the fourth magnitude at 20 light-years distance. Beyond 50 light-years such stars are below sixth magnitude and therefore invisible to the naked eye, so they are unnamed and largely unrecorded, except in astronomical sky surveys. These are the stars likely to host colonies of the CoDominium. There is no mention in the canon of closer candidate systems such as Tau Ceti and Epsilon Indi.

During the CoDominium era, instantaneous interstellar travel as a result of the Alderson Drive gave humanity the ability to explore, colonize, and exploit various star systems. As a result, many of the space settlements are on planets that are similar to Earth. At the very least, a colony world was barely inhabitable for human life without technological support. Many colonies were founded by ethnic minorities, religious groups, or political groups. Some are started by businesses, for commercial reasons. Most lack an industrial base and have little advanced technology as a result. The elite, more technologically advanced colonies are ones settled and supported by the Earth countries. These elite worlds have their own fleets and enjoy some independence from the CD.

These are apparently systems that retained enough technology after the Secession Wars to present a threat to the Second Empire, by resisting takeover and mounting raids against Empire systems. The presence or threat of Outies is mentioned in all the Second Empire stories as a reason for the Imperial Navy having to deal with events in the most expeditious way possible, rather than allowing time to achieve ideal solutions.

Pournelle's daughter, Jennifer R. Pournelle, has drawn on these themes, writing Outies, an authorized sequel to King David's Spaceship, The Mote in God's Eye, and The Gripping Hand, that attempts to marry hard science fiction with social science fiction as it explores what it means to be an "alien" in this Empire, and to what degree biology is destiny. Outies was first published as an e-book in 2010, and was then released in trade paperback in Q1, 2011.
