= The Prince (anthology) =

2002 novel by Jerry Pournelle

First edition (publ. Baen)

The Prince is a science fiction compilation by Jerry Pournelle and S. M. Stirling. It is part of the CoDominium future history series. The Prince is a compilation of four previously published novels: Falkenberg's Legion, Prince of Mercenaries, Go Tell The Spartans, and Prince of Sparta. Of the original novels, the first two were written by Pournelle alone; the last two were cowritten with Stirling. Pages 174–176 of the printed edition are new to the compilation. The Prince was published by Baen Books in hardcover (ISBN 0-7434-3556-7) in September 2002.

The title and subject matter of the book are inspired by The Prince by Niccolò Machiavelli.

== Background ==
The CoDominium is an uneasy formal alliance between the United States and the Soviet Union which holds power over Earth, with a cynically hegemonistic foreign policy toward all the other nations of Earth and Earth's off-world colonies. The action occurs over a period from the 2060s to the 2090s.

Humanity has developed interstellar flight (the Alderson Drive). It has colonized many planets outside the Solar System, simply moving in and setting up shop on some, terraforming others with a not-specified Terraforming Package that transforms an alien world into a planet that supports Terran life forms, from bacteria to plants to animals to humans. A recurring theme through the stories is the result of the CoDominium's policy of shipping large numbers of voluntary and unwilling colonists from Earth to the colonized planets. The involuntary colonists cause much trouble, knowing nothing but a welfare state existence in government ghettos (called "Welfare Islands"), where drugs, booze and entertainment, paid for by the productive members of society ("Taxpayers"), keep them pacified. Shanghaied to the colony worlds by the Bureau of Relocation ("BuReLock") in an attempt to keep Earth's population down, they gather in city centers and shanty towns, reverting to their parasitical or criminal lifestyles.

While some convict and involuntary transportees do assimilate into their new planets' societies, most band together against the original colonists of whatever world they end up on. Political parties always form to demand a consumer-oriented welfare state, ostensibly to promote social fairness but with agendas meant to advance the welfare state at the expense of the more responsible elements of society. The welfare state demanded by the influx of Terrans from the Welfare Islands requires cheap energy, a consumer industry, and an unrealistically large tax base. Even without explicit knowledge of the agenda of the socialists, the productive members of each planet's society are outraged by encroachments and banditry forcing them to yield lands or businesses which they have worked hard to establish.

Pournelle pays attention to the soldier's dilemma of being expected to obey orders without regard to the consequences to the people of the colony planets. Pournelle repeatedly discusses the resentment of the CoDominium Navy and Line Marines used to subdue local defiance of CoDominium rule to garner fortunes for Grand Senators, their cronies, and multinational corporations without the opportunity of "leaving things in working order."

Falkenberg's Mercenary Legion opposes the policies of Earth's politicians, the Humanity League, and the socialists. Working with Grand Admiral Lermontov, the admiral in command of the CoDominium Space Navy, the Legion acts to suppress the bandits, rebels and insurgents who prey on landowners, and works against corrupt politicians bent on exploitation.

The saga follows the progress of John Christian Falkenberg from a junior officer in the Line Marines of the CoDominium Navy to a senior Marine colonel. Forced out of the CoDominium Line Marines on a technicality, Falkenberg is a military genius with a flair for the bold and unconventional, often resorting to deception to win battles. The core of Falkenberg's Mercenary Legion comprises officers and NCOs from the 42nd Line Marine Regiment, commanded by Falkenberg before budget cuts caused its disestablishment, and recruits enlisted from planets on which the Legion fights. Falkenberg's rise through the officer ranks of the CoDominium military and the growth of the Legion's reputation is paired with the decline and fall of the CoDominium.

Falkenberg has a powerful enemy in Grand Senator Adrian Bronson of Earth, who blames him for the death of his grandson and heir while under Falkenberg's command. Bronson also opposes Grand Admiral Sergei Lermontov, Falkenberg's mentor, whose goal is to preserve the CoDominium as long as possible.

Scientific and technical advances with military implications (which turn out to be virtually all scientific and technical advances) are ruthlessly suppressed by the CoDominium. Also, the cost of importing and maintaining advanced technology means that cheaper, less modern alternatives are common. Mules, donkeys and horses are superior to trucks on a colony world, while a handful of tanks might be the deciding factor in a campaign. Planetary forces and mercenary units are equipped with rifles, machine guns, grenades, mortars and light artillery. Tanks are a scarce, costly commodity. A few helicopters are available, but in most situations are vulnerable to man-portable antiaircraft missiles.

== Arrarat ==
Originally published as the novel West of Honor, later incorporated into Falkenberg's Legion.

Founded by religious zealots, Arrarat′s agrarian society is besieged by well-organized and well-supplied bandit gangs composed mainly of involuntary colonists. The story is told in first-person narrative by just graduated and commissioned Lieutenant Harlan (“Hal”) Slater of the CoDominium Line Marines. Slater and two classmates from the Academy were chosen by John Christian Falkenberg, the youngest captain in the history of the CoDominium Marines, to oversee the transfer of Marines to the planet Arrarat to suppress local unrest.

Falkenberg takes Slater and the group of guardhouse scrapings and ne'er-do-wells he brought to Arrarat and forms the 501st Provisional Battalion to respond to an urgent request from the governor of Arrarat. The governor had requested a regiment of military police (Garrison Marines) and a destroyer for fire support to deal with the numerous lawless bands in control of much of the countryside. The superannuated CoDominium officers stationed on the planet, all Garrison Marines, fear the havoc unruly Line Marines will create in the capital city of Harmony.

To avoid this, Falkenberg elects to take the Line Marines upriver to the bandit-occupied Fort Beersheba, an outpost built by the Line Marine regiment that had initially pacified the planet. Slater is tasked with taking and holding Fort Beersheba. In a daring night assault using one company of airlifted troops, Slater takes the fort while Falkenberg marches the remainder of the newly organized 501st Provisional Battalion up the Jordan River valley to relieve him. Holding the fort is not easy; though disorganized and untrained, the enemy outnumbers Slater′s A Company almost ten to one and has mortars and machine guns as well as smallarms. Although A Company takes heavy casualties, Slater holds his position long enough to delay the bandits until Falkenberg arrives with heavy artillery to break the siege. Slater and A Company are decorated for their valiant stand at Fort Beersheba.

After establishing the fort as a base, Slater and the other officers watch the restless and combat-eager Marines suffer more and more from le cafard, aka “the Bug,” a kind of military cabin fever frequently endured by soldiers of the French Foreign Legion who are the ancestors of the CoDominium Line Marines. Partly to combat this growing problem, Falkenberg and Colonel Harrington, head of Arrarat's small permanent Marine garrison, urge the planetary governor to move against the bandits tyrannizing the farmers of the Jordan Valley, who simply want to farm and be left alone by both the central government and the bandit gangs. Governor Swale refuses, pleading lack of resources – and his previous treaties with the bandit "governments" in Arrarat's interior farming country which compel the farmers to turn over most of what they grow as "taxes" and sell their grain through the bandits to the coastal cities.

The bandit groups break their deal with Governor Swale, jacking prices on grain up precipitously and stopping shipments entirely to encourage Swale and the citizens of his coastal cities to accept the new deal. Governor Swale goes to Fort Beersheba to demand that Falkenberg's regiment go to the Allan Valley farm country to force the Mission Hills Protective Association (the bandit gang terrorizing the farmers) to honor their previous agreement. Falkenberg asks Swale how, exactly, he's to restore the grain supply from farmers who are already oppressed by bandits and unlikely to respond to pressure from both the planetary government and the local bandit gang. When the governor cannot provide a logical answer and refuses Falkenberg's counter-offer to take the farm country back from the bandits, Falkenberg refuses the order to march, as do the Marine garrison commander and Falkenberg's junior officers.

Vowing to have them all broken out of the service, Governor Swale orders the Harmony militia (a poorly trained and equipped volunteer part-time military force) to march on the farm country, and accompanies them. However, the governor′s campaign goes poorly and his forces are besieged in the town of Allansport, forcing him to call on Falkenberg and the 501st for help. Sensing things are not as they seem, Falkenberg sends Slater and A Company on a deception mission to bait the enemy south of Allansport, where they find themselves facing the major enemy force waiting in ambush for the main body of the 501st. Though A Company takes heavy casualties, its survivors are able to spot for Falkenberg′s artillery; and Slater takes and holds a strategic hill called the Rockpile. His success cuts the enemy line of retreat and insures their defeat. Slater is severely wounded and medevacked to the capital for regeneration therapy, his second trip to the medics since arriving on Arrarat.

The political fallout of the Allan Valley Campaign is morally equivocal. Led by a pair of religious fanatics, the farmers avenge themselves on anyone who collaborated with the bandits. Meanwhile, the colonial governor, who was trying to use the bandits to generate revenue to be used to set up industries on Arrarat to provide employment for the time-expired convicts, reveals himself to be in the Bronson camp – and to have arranged the sale of mineral rights from land controlled by the bandits to mining companies affiliated with Grand Senator Bronson.

The story ends with now-Major Falkenberg explaining the facts described above to Slater, admitting that industrialization should occur in Arrarat to preserve civilization there; but not on Swale's terms, and not merely to enrich the clients of Earth politicians like Bronson. Falkenberg then recruits the newly brevet-promoted and decorated Captain Hal Slater (who, not even a year out of the Academy, is now the youngest captain in the history of the Line Marines) into joining him in Falkenberg′s next assignment as regimental adjutant of the 42nd Line Marine Regiment. Slater′s Arrarat-born girlfriend Kathryn agrees to marry and go with him.

== Hadley ==
Originally part of the novel The Mercenary, later incorporated into Falkenberg's Legion.

Grand Admiral Sergei Lermontov, commanding the CoDominium Navy, has examined the political situation on Earth and reached the grim conclusion that Earth is going to destroy itself and slag down into barbarism within a generation. He realizes that if civilization and humanity are to survive, that survival will have to be off Earth, somewhere among Terra's colony worlds.

John Christian Falkenberg is secretly recruited by Admiral Lermontov and charged with creating a military force that can create or support a government on one or more of the colonized planets capable of providing the Fleet with a home port when the CoDominium collapses. He is courtmartialed and discharged from the CoDominium Marines on a technicality in order to operate as a mercenary (though because of Grand Senator Bronson's vendetta against him, he was likely to have been arrested anyway).

On Hadley he encounters a situation he has seen on other colonies, with the added factor that the CD is pulling out and granting the colony "independence." The CoDominium, with less and less money to run the Fleet, has been quietly cutting loose the outlying colony worlds to sink or swim on their own. Few of these worlds are sufficiently well-developed to survive at the CoDominium's level of technology, and most are likely to revert to barbarism within two generations. The local authorities are trying to create power bases by creating paramilitary units, some from landowners or industrialists, others from convicts and involuntary colonists. Falkenberg, nominally working for Hadley's government to create its own army, begins recruiting and training his Mercenary Legion, with a battalion of officers and noncoms from his last command, the disestablished 42nd Line Marine Regiment, as the cadre. Eventually this force of three battalions, plus a battalion of local troops nominally part of the Legion but officered by local political hacks and trained separately (and loyal to Ernest Bradford, First Vice President of Hadley), allows him to dictate the outcome.

The First Vice President attempts to stage a coup and threatens to kill Hadley's President Budreau, but is instead shot by Legionnaires; Falkenberg anticipated Bradford's actions. The reason for the coup is to promote a takeover by "democratic" socialist forces organizing the underclasses. Since most available resources, particularly fusion power urgently needed to build a transport net to move food and people where they are needed are already being used to feed the underclass, any takeover by the populists who have no understanding of how their society works would lead to planetary collapse. Falkenberg carries out a military assault on the socialists in a stadium, killing thousands and eliminating their leaders. The scene of the soldiers descending from the topmost level of the stadium, firing in volleys, is very like the classic Odessa Steps sequence in the movie The Battleship Potemkin (except that the readers' sympathies are completely reversed). The ruthlessness of the assault is similar to Napoleon's tactics used when dealing with uprisings in Paris. The sequence is also reminiscent of Belisarius' slaughter of the Nika rioters in the Hippodrome in 6th century Constantinople.

With the local socialist movement decapitated, Hadley is left in the hands of Second Vice President, now Planetary President, George Hamner. He is an engineer who understands the need to remove the population from the cities to the countryside, build a reliable transportation network, set the involuntary colonists to working the land, and stabilize the agricultural economy if Hadley is to survive at anything above the medieval level. Falkenberg, angered by the necessity of his actions and fully aware that he has perpetrated an atrocity – though convinced it was necessary and unavoidable – takes the Legion and departs. Later, "Crofton's Encyclopedia of Contemporary History and Social Issues" refer to the reports of excessive violence on both sides (an understatement, given the outbreak of widespread murder, arson and looting that was only ended by the stadium massacre), saying that "... the government of Hadley has expressed satisfaction with Falkenberg's efforts there."

=== Thurstone/Santiago ===
Originally a short story "His Truth Goes Marching On", later incorporated into Prince of Mercenaries.

Captain Peter Owensford of Falkenberg's Mercenary Legion recounts how, as a lieutenant in a volunteer brigade sponsored by the Earth Humanity League, he was part of an intervention on the side of Republican forces against the local rulers, a Spanish aristocracy known as Carlists. Because of the dumping of involuntary colonists from Earth, the Santiago colony on Thurstone has progressed to de facto slavery by debt bondage to maintain the social order.

The campaign is brutal, especially with an officer corps of political appointees unable to make proper military decisions. A political officer in the Soviet zampolit style, parroting liberty and atheism instead of communism overrules Owensford's tactical decisions and impedes the training of his men. In the end, after losing many troops, Owensford catches the zampolit and some cronies preparing to use an atomic bomb to destroy his command and provoke the CoDominium Navy to act against the Carlists. He confiscates the bomb and attempts to retreat, but is caught in a Carlist advance. Owensford surrenders his small company to Falkenberg's Mercenary Legion (who as professionals detached from local politics are less likely to execute him out of hand than the Carlists would be), and becomes a mercenary himself. His commanding officer in the Volunteer Brigade, Captain Anselm "Ace" Barton, a fellow West Pointer, has already done so.

Parallels with the Spanish Civil War are many and, according to Pournelle, intentional.

== Tanith ==
Originally the novel Prince of Mercenaries. Parts of the novel incorporate the short story "Silent Leges".

On the jungle planet of Tanith, Falkenberg is working with Governor Carlton Blaine, another Lermontov ally. Tanith is the source of a drug used in the Welfare Islands, borloi, and the revenue from the traffic is being used to support the Fleet as the Senate on Earth cuts its support year by year. Most of the workers on the plantations are convicts. Falkenberg is tasked with ending a rebellion in plantation country. Many of the planters are holding out their borloi, wanting a better price than the CoDominium Navy will pay. Admiral Lermontov and Grand Senator John Grant, his ally in the Grand Senate, are not happy that the Navy is dealing in drugs grown by peons (and perforce must support the slavemasters), but the money thus raised is helping to keep the Fleet operating. Grand Senator Bronson is behind the rebellion, though his involvement is not obvious to anyone save Falkenberg and his command staff.

Crown Prince Lysander of Sparta, heir to the throne of a planet founded with certain political ideals by the Constitutional Society, comes to Tanith to learn about Falkenberg. Sparta is in need of a full-time military force, and they are considering putting Falkenberg and the Legion on retainer to establish their army.

Lysander finds himself in the middle of a plot by Grand Senator Bronson to hijack a borloi shipment. Enlisting with Falkenberg as a cornet (a very junior officer, really an officer-trainee), Lysander learns the realities of military life. The principal military opposition is a battalion of mercenaries, Barton's Bulldogs, commanded by Major Ace Barton (a former Legion officer), who are working for the planters. Lysander plays a major role in the Legion's foiling the theft of the drugs. Barton and Falkenberg broker a truce between the Tanith government and the planters, with the Bulldogs rescuing Falkenberg when one of the planters reneges on the agreement and takes Falkenberg hostage.

Barton's part in the rebellion and his turning against Bronson means he has to leave the planet. With few options, he rejoins Falkenberg, who absorbs the defeated Bulldogs into Falkenberg's Mercenary Legion. Lysander commits Sparta to Lermontov's plan to use Sparta as a base for the CoDominium Navy and Marines after the coming collapse of the CoDominium.

After the ending of the planters' rebellion and the expiration of the Legion's contract with the Tanith government, Falkenberg is approached by a rebel group from the planet New Washington to become the main striking force in a revolution against the government of the Franklin Confederacy, another planet in the same system that treats them as a backward colony. At the same time the newly-activated Fifth Battalion of the Legion, commanded by the just-promoted Major Peter Owensford with Captain Ace Barton as his second-in-command, is dispatched on contract to the Dual Monarchy of Sparta to set up the Royal Army there.

== New Washington ==
Originally a short novel, "Sword and Scepter". Part of the novel The Mercenary, later incorporated into Falkenberg's Legion

Falkenberg's Mercenary Legion departs Tanith for a contract on the planet New Washington. This is one of a pair of planets, orbiting a common center which itself orbits a red dwarf star. The two planets are tidally locked, so they always present the same face to each other. As day progresses to night on New Washington, the side of the sister planet Franklin facing it goes from night to day. One revolution takes 40 hours. The pair revolve around their star in 52 days. It is one of the farthest colonies from Earth, being over a hundred parsecs away.

New Washington was founded by dissidents from the colony on Franklin, and eventually rebelled against the Franklin Confederacy officials who govern New Washington. Franklin responded by sending its own domestic troops, but these were defeated in a brilliant campaign by the rebels. However, the rebellion was crushed in a set-piece battle by mercenaries hired by Franklin from Earth, Friedland (a German-settled planet whose mercenary forces specialize in armored warfare), and Covenant (a Scots-settled planet with a reputation for producing fierce infantrymen) on an open plain on the Franklin-occupied side of the Temblor Mountains which divide New Washington's only continent. The Friedlander tanks and Covenant infantry destroyed New Washington's citizen army, and Franklin's forces retaliated against the rebel population, burning ranches and towns to discourage further rebellion. Franklin left the Friedland and Covenanter troops to maintain order.

Falkenberg is hired by the rebels to throw out the invaders. The rebel leaders on New Washington are not entirely behind his military objectives, but see his mercenary unit as a nucleus around which a new rebellion can form. After a stealthy spaceborne insertion, Falkenberg and his forces attack the isolated loyalist town of Allansport to give him an operating base, from which his troops take the allegedly impregnable fortress of Astoria, capturing a number of Friedland self-propelled guns there.

After Astoria is taken, Falkenberg's units mount a "shock and awe" invasion through large areas of territory, leading the organized forces of the rebel government in another blitzkrieg. The Legion and their allies overwhelm the occupying troops on the west side of the mountain range, "keepin' up the skeer" and sending them running while bypassing and besieging the few large concentrations of Franklin troops and their off-planet mercenaries. In an eighty-hour campaign, Falkenberg and the rebel forces occupy almost all of New Washington west of the Temblors.

The campaign comes to a decisive battle when a detachment of Falkenberg's forces, supported by the self-propelled artillery captured from the Friedlanders and from Franklin units in the path of the blitzkrieg, and a force of New Washington rebel militia guarding the guns and also operating as a vanguard, fight a battle within Hillyer Gap, the only usable pass through the Temblor Mountains between rebel-held country and Franklin territory. Falkenberg's ad-hoc task force stops the advance of a brigade of Friedland armor and a regiment of Covenant Highlanders at the pass, inflicting devastating casualties on them with his captured artillery. This phase of the second New Washington rebellion is won when a Covenant Highlander officer comes forward under a white flag seeking a truce that would permit the Covenanters to recover their dead and wounded, and for the Legion to transfer the Highlander wounded back to their own medics. Falkenberg grants a truce of four New Washington days and nights—160 standard hours. "They tried to force the passage, and we beat them fairly. Honor is satisfied. Now the Confederacy will have to bring up its own Regulars if they want to force a way through the Gap. I don't think they'll squander men like that, and anyway it takes time." The rebellion becomes a stalemate, with Confederate forces unable to force Hillyer Gap or outflank the forces Falkenberg commands through the swamps south of the Temblors.

Falkenberg becomes embroiled in rebel politics, at the same time easing into a relationship with Glenda Ruth Horton, commander of the rebel infantry forces and leader of one of the major rebel factions. The rebel force sent to relieve the small garrison Falkenberg left behind in Allansport to secure the town loots and burns it after their commander tells them they can claim part of any government property they find as a reward, this occurring just after Falkenberg and Glenda Ruth won the engagement at Hillyer Gap. The sack of Allansport is a direct violation of the Laws of War, a vestige of CoDominium control over its former colonies that is sporadically enforced by the CoDominium Navy and Marines.

Falkenberg leaves the Legion guarding the pass, bringing a detachment with him to investigate the situation at Allansport. He convinces Glenda Ruth to relieve the ambitious politician Jack Silana who had taken over at Allansport, then returns to the rebel capital with Glenda Ruth and the mayor of Allansport, an influential Loyalist politician. Silana is outraged at his removal and has influence with the leadership. Other rebel leaders are outraged at Falkenberg's four-day-long truce with the Highlanders, demanding that Falkenberg try to force the pass himself. Falkenberg and Glenda Ruth realize this would place their forces at the mercy of the Friedland and Covenant troops that defeated the rebels the first time. Glenda Ruth uses every trick of politics and parliamentary procedure she knows to stall a vote on forcing the Legion to attack. At this point, a CoDominium cruiser arrives, ostensibly to investigate reports of an alleged breach of the Laws of War.

Her captain is a Lermontov loyalist, helping to implement the Grand Admiral's plan for the survival of civilization. The Grand Admiral is concerned with the Franklin / New Washington situation because of the potential the system has to adversely impact his plan. In possession of New Washington's mines and industrial plants, Franklin would be able to build a naval fleet that could attack other star systems. Lermontov's goal was to pacify the planet at minimum cost by creating a pretext for the CoDominium to order the mercenaries on both sides to leave. The Franklin Confederacy alone does not possess enough strength to bring New Washington back under its control, thus ending that particular threat to the peace. Aware of all of this, Falkenberg had been expecting the arrival of that CoDominium ship for some time.

However, Colonel Falkenberg has decided to stay on New Washington – to settle down after his many wanderings and adventures, marry Glenda Ruth Horton whom he considers a fitting mate for himself, and sit out the coming disaster on and around Earth. Falkenberg negotiates a contract with the mayor of Allansport, to enforce the Laws of War and protect Allansport from rebel violence in return for 50% ownership of the mines and mills there. Falkenberg also tricks the mayor into authorizing a land grant for the Legion, the mayor not realizing that this was a strategic move which decided the entire war. With the land grant confirmed by both the New Washington rebel government and the pro-Franklin Loyalist administration, under CoDominium law the Legionnaires become settlers instead of mercenaries. This means that while the Franklin mercenaries are forced off New Washington, the Legion stays and effectively is in control of the entire planet. In the end, with the Confederates driven off the planet, Falkenberg becomes Protector of New Washington, with the local rebel factions which started the war being marginalized. In fact Falkenberg is effectively king of New Washington, observing that "Maybe people are ready for monarchy again, at that." (Later volumes of Pournelle's Future History show that monarchy is indeed about to make a major comeback). New Washington is now firmly in the Lermontov camp, and can serve as a base for the Fleet.

Meanwhile, tensions on Earth have grown to the point that when there is a vote of no confidence in the Grand Senate, the Senate dissolves and there is not enough stability in many districts to appoint or elect new Grand Senators. Earth is lurching towards the Great Patriotic Wars which will leave the planet a devastated, desolate ruin and destroy the CoDominium.

== Sparta ==
Originally the novels Go Tell The Spartans and Prince of Sparta, co-written with S.M. Stirling)

The remaining narrative takes place on the planet Sparta. This terraformed world has a higher gravity that Earth, a higher partial pressure of oxygen, and was settled by academics pursuing a form of government inspired partly by the United States Constitution and partly by the culture of the Kingdom of Sparta in the Classical Era of Greece. The planet has been settled for approximately three generations. Like all of the colony worlds, the population is partly volunteer emigrants and partly involuntary colonists and convicts dispatched there by BuReLock (the Codominium's Bureau of Relocation). The latter form an underclass.

Sparta is a constitutional dual monarchy, one King taking external affairs, the other King being involved in the domestic economy. Citizenship with the right to vote is an earned privilege, as in the Terran Federation of Heinlein's Starship Troopers. Citizens are also expected to join the militia, built on the model of the Swiss militia system. The militia battalions are based on membership in the phratries of Sparta, to which all Citizens and Citizen-candidates must belong. Other than enforcing basic law and providing education and public services, the government does not interfere in the lives of the people. Prosperity or starvation is the responsibility of the individual.

The underclass can attempt to become Citizens; many do, and on achieving Citizenship enjoy the same rights and privileges as those born on Sparta. For the rest, the usual populists and progressives try to organize them into a Movement. Paradoxically, Sparta's openness and political transparency makes it more vulnerable to such a movement than dictatorships such as Carlist Santiago. One such movement, the Non-Citizens Liberation Front, has a guerrilla army of self-styled Helots.

After the episode on Tanith, Grand Senator Bronson begins building up the open and covert oppositions on Sparta. His motives are actually similar to Admiral Lermontov's; he too wishes to set up a power base among the colonies to preserve his version of civilization when the CoDominium collapses. However, his goal is to become "Chairman of as much as possible" (read: dictator) and establish a dynasty, continuing the Welfare system of Earth with himself as the head of an empire of some kind. His lust for power precludes his finding common ground with Lermontov, Blaine and Falkenberg. Bronson rejects the Admiral's attempt to broker a truce between him and Falkenberg's Mercenary Legion, and by extension planets like Sparta and other Lermontov allies.

Instead, he sends supplies and advisors to organize the Helot forces and employs techno-ninja saboteurs from Meiji, a Japanese-settled planet that specializes in high technology, to infiltrate and corrupt the data systems on Sparta before an open revolt is launched, and at the direction of the Helot leadership, to conduct a program of judicious assassinations. Bronson's objective is to take over and control Sparta and its resources. His title in connection with the Spartan revolutionary movement is Earth Prime.

The Non-Citizens Liberation Front is led by Senator Dion Croser, a highly intelligent second-generation Spartan who is the son of one of the Founders, the professors, idealists, and members of the Constitutional Society who formed the first wave of settlers, wrote the Spartan constitution, and established their form of government. Croser feels that his father was done out of his rightful position as the head of government (one of the two Spartan kings, in other words) and by way of righting that wrong wants to overthrow the government and create a "democracy" similar to the oligarchy the United States of America has devolved into, with himself as its President. He gets together with Skida Thibodeau, an amoral convict whose life experience indicates you are either on top holding the whip, or on the bottom being whipped; and who has no intention of ever being on the bottom again, to advance his goal. The NCLF organizes public protests, holds rallies, makes public broadcasts, encourages civil disobedience by non-Citizens, and generally makes itself a bloody nuisance to the Spartan government. The NCLF also quietly recruits malcontents among the convicts and involuntary transportees, and idealists from among those born on Sparta, for the Spartan Peoples Liberation Army. It further engages in an ongoing sabotage campaign. Croser's title within the revolutionary movement is Capital Prime.

The Spartan Peoples Liberation Army is led by a woman, Skida "Skilly" Thibodeau, a native of Belize transported off Earth after arrest for criminal activity. Thibodeau is highly intelligent and an amateur student of military history; a profile developed by Legion Intelligence suggests that she may be a sociopath. Skida devises complex operations against the Dual Monarchy, which the Legion is able to detect and defeat despite the Helots' advanced weaponry and sabotage campaigns. The Helots have off-planet assistance from Earth Prime in the form of military equipment and supplies up to and including surface-to-air missiles and direct induction teaching machines, former CoDominium Marine officers and noncoms, and the technoninjas from Meiji, who work for Bronson but have been instructed to accept Helot orders up to a point. Thibodeau's title within the revolutionary movement is Field Prime.

There is no visible linkage between the Spartan Peoples Liberation Army and the NCLF, though the connection exists. Likewise, there is no provable connection between Grand Senator Bronson and the Helot rebels, though Falkenberg's Mercenary Legion knows he is supporting them.

To end the Helot rebellion, the Fifth Battalion of Falkenberg's Mercenary Legion is sent to Sparta to create a standing army, something Sparta has never before needed. Commanding the Fifth is Major Peter Owensford, with Captain Ace Barton (the mercenary commander Falkenberg defeated on Tanith) as his second in command. They are joined by Dr. Caldwell Whitlock, a sociologist, analyst, and political historian from Earth who has been retained by the Spartan monarchy and Falkenberg as a political analyst and advisor; and Lieutenant Colonel Hal Slater, recently retired from the Legion due to injuries too severe for regeneration to fully repair, whose mission is to establish the Royal Spartan Military Academy and Royal Spartan War College, with the rank of major general in the nascent Royal Spartan Army. (It has been suggested that with his American Southern roots, Whitlock may be a stand-in for the author, Jerry Pournelle, who is from Louisiana.)

Much of the narrative is taken up with three bloody campaigns in which Skilly's Helot rebels employ artillery, missiles, rape, murder, poison gas, terror attacks, and civilian massacre in an attempt to undermine Spartan society. The net effect, however, is to unify the Citizens and the Crown, the opposite of what the SPLA and the NCLF desire. Along the way, the Fifth Battalion of the Legion is accepted by the Spartan culture, which comes to view them as Spartans, not mercenaries. Following the passage of the Ultimate Decree (an extreme form of martial law) by the Spartan Senate, the NCLF is taken down by the Spartan government's law enforcement agencies. Those among its leadership and members found guilty of terrorist acts are hanged as traitors after interrogation. The Helot field army is eventually destroyed by the Spartan Royal Army, the Brotherhood militias, and the Legion, working in concert under the leadership of Crown Prince Lysander, Brigadier General Ace Barton, and Major General Peter Owensford.

The penultimate act of the Bronson campaign is an attempt to use the 77th Line Marine Regiment, whose colonel is loyal to Bronson, to force the Dual Monarchy to disavow, disarm, and turn over the Fifth Battalion of the Legion to them. King Alexander and King David of Sparta refuse this demand. The 77th has the support of the suborned Codominium Navy battle cruiser Patton, whose captain is an opportunist loyal to neither the Grand Admiral's nor Bronson factions. The presumption is that without the Legion, Sparta will not be able to resist the CoDominium forces. At the same time, Skilly launches a general uprising by Helot elements in the capital to destroy the government and take Sparta City while the Spartans are fighting the 77th. Skilly believes if she can take the city, the CoDominium forces will recognize her as the legitimate ruler of Sparta.

The planet's orbiting space station/weapons platform is taken over by elements of the 77th, then retaken by the Legion and CoDominium Navy units loyal to Lermontov. A fratricidal space battle between the battle cruiser whose captain is aware of what he can do with the force at his command on one side, and the recaptured space station plus the CoDominium naval squadron based on Sparta whose captains and officers support Lermontov on the other, is averted. The scenario graphically demonstrates the chaos to come after the CoDominium falls.

Ordinary armed Spartan Citizens stand and fight with so much determination that the Line Marines, contrasting the Citizens with the Helots, change sides. Working together, the 77th, the unorganized Spartan reserve, and the few Brotherhood militia units in the city suppress the Helot rioters and restore order. However, Lysander's father King Alexander, a longtime Lermontov ally, is killed when the palace is assaulted and he leads the Life Guard out to defend it. Crown Prince Lysander succeeds him.

One of the SPLA officers, a nephew of Grand Senator Bronson who had been a field grade officer in the Helot Army and Skilly Thibodeau's lover, defects and informs Lysander and General Owensford that there is an atomic bomb somewhere in the capital. Skilly, on the run following the destruction of the Spartan Peoples Liberation Army and the failure of the Helot rebellion in Sparta City, contacts the Spartan commanders, offering the location of the bomb in return for the government's lifting the price on her head and calling off the official search for her. King Lysander and General Owensford agree to do so, but unbeknownst to her it will make no difference. Two long-serving sergeants of the Legion with a highly developed sense of vendetta simply take leaves to accomplish privately what the government cannot do officially. It is implied that Skilly's head will shortly be brought in encased in a block of lucite.

The problem of the captured or surrendered underclass Helot soldiers is dealt with in a fashion that again echoes Heinlein's ideas, this the one of being sent to Coventry. Those who do not accept Sparta's social contract will be given basic tools and sent to a large, uninhabited island to make their own way without government interference. It is suggested that after a few years, the survivors can try to work out a better deal.

There remains the problem of preserving civilization, however. The CoDominium has fallen, but if civilization is to be preserved there must be some power beyond that of planetary or systemwide governments that can keep the peace and insure that justice is done. Admiral Lermontov's work had been entirely to this goal. However, Lermontov has been deposed by a rump Grand Senate composed of Adrian Bronson, his allies, and his vassals. It is not known if the Grand Admiral is dead or imprisoned, but the leadership on Sparta presumes he is dead.

In his final orders to the Fleet, the Grand Admiral names a group of people the Fleet can obey with honor until they themselves appoint a single leader to direct them: Grand Senator John Grant; Carlton Blaine, Governor of Tanith; Colonel John Christian Falkenberg; and King Alexander of Sparta.

However, they are separated by light-years of space and months of transit time. Plus which, John Christian is now Protector of New Washington, and King Alexander is dead. Dr. Whitlock and General Slater knew that if circumstances permitted, Colonel Falkenberg favored offering command to King Alexander. With the CoDominium in collapse and all Earth authority vanished, the CoDominium Navy officers, the lieutenant colonel now commanding the 77th Line Marine Regiment, Lieutenant Colonel Owensford of Falkenberg's Mercenary Legion, and the senior officers of the Spartan Army, notably General Slater, acclaim Lysander, Collins King of Sparta, as Imperator, in the hope he will bring the disparate sources of power together to preserve civilization.

== Reviews ==
In Armor Magazine Major Kevin Benson stated the Sparta section of "This book will also give you a great starting point for a class or series of classes on Low Intensity Conflict (LIC)"
