= Larry Niven bibliography =

A list of works by, or about, the American science fiction author Larry Niven.

== Novels ==
=== Tales of Known Space ===
- World of Ptavvs (1966)
- A Gift from Earth (1968)
- Neutron Star (1968 collection)
- The Shape of Space (1969 collection)
- Protector (1973)—Hugo and Locus SF Awards nominee, 1974
- Tales of Known Space: The Universe of Larry Niven (1975 collection)
  - Three Books of Known Space (1996 reprint of Tales of Known Space, with "Madness Has Its Place" in place of "The Borderland of Sol", bundled with World of Ptavvs and A Gift from Earth)
- The Long ARM of Gil Hamilton (1976 collection, reprinted as Flatlander in 1995 with additional content including The Patchwork Girl)
- The Patchwork Girl (1980)
- World of Ptavvs / A Gift From Earth / Neutron Star (1991 omnibus)
- Crashlander: The Collected Tales of Beowulf Shaeffer (1994 collection)

Ringworld

1. Ringworld (1970)—Nebula Award, 1970 Hugo and Locus SF Awards winner, 1971
2. The Ringworld Engineers (1979)—Hugo and Locus SF Awards nominee, 1981
3. The Ringworld Throne (1996)
4. Ringworld's Children (2004)

- Guide to Larry Niven's Ringworld (1994, with Kevin Stein)

Worlds series (with Edward M. Lerner)

1. Fleet of Worlds (2007)
2. Juggler of Worlds (2008)
3. Destroyer of Worlds (2009)
4. Betrayer of Worlds (2010)
5. Fate of Worlds (2012)—Also serves as conclusion to Ringworld series

Man-Kzin Wars

Niven opened up the Man–Kzin Wars part of Known Space to other writers as a shared universe. He wrote six of the stories in the anthologies, but aside from these the Man–Kzin Wars books were written by other authors.

- Anthologies
1. The Man-Kzin Wars (1988)
2. Man-Kzin Wars II (1989)
3. Man-Kzin Wars III (1990)
4. Man-Kzin Wars IV (1991)
5. Man-Kzin Wars V (1992)
6. Man-Kzin Wars VI (1994)
7. Man-Kzin Wars VII (1995)
8. Man-Kzin Wars VIII: Choosing Names (1998)
  - The Best of All Possible Wars: The Best of the Man-Kzin Wars (1998)
9. Man-Kzin Wars IX (2002)
10. Man-Kzin Wars X: The Wunder War (2003)
11. Man-Kzin Wars XI (2005)
12. Man-Kzin Wars XII (2009)
13. Man-Kzin Wars XIII (2012)
14. Man-Kzin Wars XIV (2013)
15. Man-Kzin Wars XV (2019)
- Novels
1. Cathouse: A Novel of the Man Kzin-Wars (1990, by Dean Ing)
  - Cathouse compiles two stories from the first two "Man-Kzin Wars" books and contains no new material.
2. The Children's Hour: A Novel of the Man-Kzin Wars (1991, by Jerry Pournelle and S. M. Stirling)
  - The Children's Hour contains some material previously published in "Man-Kzin Wars" volumes II and III.
3. Inconstant Star (1991, by Poul Anderson)
  - Inconstant Star compiles two stories from "Man-Kzin Wars" volumes I and III and contains no new material.
4. A Darker Geometry (1996, by Mark O. Martin and Gregory Benford)
  - A Darker Geometry contains some material previously published in "Man-Kzin Wars" volume VII.
5. The Houses of the Kzinti (2002, by Dean Ing, Jerry Pournelle, S. M. Stirling)
  - Houses of the Kzinti is a compiled edition of the previously published Cathouse and The Children's Hour and contains no new material.
6. Destiny's Forge: A Man-Kzin Wars Novel (2007, by Paul Chafe)

=== The State ===
1. A World Out of Time (1976)—Locus SF Award nominee, 1977
2. The Integral Trees (1984)—Nebula Award nominee, 1984; Locus SF Award winner, and Hugo nominee, 1985
3. The Smoke Ring (1987)

=== Magic Goes Away ===
- The Magic Goes Away (1978)
- The Magic May Return (1981)
- More Magic (1984)
- The Time of the Warlock (1984 collection of two short stories plus The Magic Goes Away)
- The Magic Goes Away Collection (2005 omnibus of The Magic Goes Away, The Magic May Return, and More Magic)

=== Heorot ===
1. The Legacy of Heorot (1987) (with Steven Barnes and Jerry Pournelle) (release order book 1)
2. Beowulf's Children (1995, UK: The Dragons of Heorot) (with Barnes and Pournelle) (book 2)
3. The Dragons of Heorot (1996) (with Steven Barnes and Jerry Pournelle) (UK version of book 2)
4. Destiny's Road (1997) (by Niven alone; not precisely a continuation of the Heorot series: located in the same universe, events from the first two novels are briefly mentioned) (book 3)
5. The Secret of Black Ship Island (2012) (novella; with Steven Barnes and Jerry Pournelle) (release order book 4) (stated book “1.5” in series ie. should be read between books 1 and 2 in series)
6. Starborn & Godsons (2020) (with Barnes and Pournelle) (release order book 5) (stated book 3 in series)

=== With Jerry Pournelle ===
- Lucifer's Hammer (1977)—Hugo Award nominee, 1978
- Oath of Fealty (1981)
- Footfall (1985)—Hugo and Locus SF Awards nominee, 1986
- Lucifer's Anvil or Samael's Forge (in-progress as of 2013) (not a sequel to Lucifer's Hammer)

Dante series

1. Inferno (1976)—Hugo and Nebula Awards nominee, 1976
2. Escape from Hell (2009)

Moties—part of Pournelle's CoDominium fictional universe

1. The Mote in God's Eye (1974)—Hugo, Nebula and Locus SF Awards nominee, 1975
2. The Gripping Hand (1993, UK: The Moat Around Murcheson's Eye)

Golden Road (set in the same "Magic Universe" as The Magic Goes Away)

1. The Burning City (2000)
2. Burning Tower (2005)
3. Burning Mountain (in progress)

=== With Steven Barnes ===
- The Descent of Anansi (1982)
- Achilles' Choice (1991)
- Saturn's Race (2000)
- The Seascape Tattoo (2016) (part of the Magic Goes Away universe)
- Ice Vegas (2026)

Dream Park

1. Dream Park (1981)—Locus SF Award nominee, 1982
2. The Barsoom Project (1989)
3. The California Voodoo Game (1992, UK: The Voodoo Game)
4. The Moon Maze Game (2011)

=== With Gregory Benford ===
Bowl of Heaven

- Bowl of Heaven (2012)
- Shipstar (2014)
- Glorious (2020)

=== Other novels ===
- The Flying Sorcerers (1971, with David Gerrold), previously serialized as "The Misspelled Magishun", includes portraits of other science fiction authors—e.g. the lead character name becomes translated into the local language as "As a color, shade of purple-gray" (or Purple for short), that is, "As-A-Mauve"
- Berserker Base: A Collaborative Novel (1984, with Poul Anderson, Edward Bryant, Stephen R. Donaldson, Fred Saberhagen, Connie Willis, and Roger Zelazny)
- Fallen Angels (1991, with Jerry Pournelle and Michael Flynn)
- Building Harlequin's Moon (2005, with Brenda Cooper)
- The Goliath Stone (2013, with Matthew Joseph Harrington)

== Short fiction ==
Collections

- All the Myriad Ways (1971)
- The Flight of the Horse (1973)
  Includes five "Svetz" stories later collected in Rainbow Mars, plus two other stories.
- Inconstant Moon (1973)
  UK collection, includes "Known Space" and non-"Known Space" stories.
- A Hole in Space (1974)
- Convergent Series (1979)
- Niven's Laws (1984)
- Limits (1985)
- N-Space (1990)
- Playgrounds of the Mind (1991)
- Bridging the Galaxies (1993)
- Rainbow Mars (1999)
- Scatterbrain (2003)
- Larry Niven Short Stories Volume 1 (2003)
- Larry Niven Short Stories Volume 2 (2003)
- Larry Niven Short Stories Volume 3 (2003)
- The Draco Tavern (2006)
- Stars and Gods (August 2010)
- The Best of Larry Niven (November 2010)
- Red Tide (October 2014). With Brad R. Torgersen & Matthew J. Harrington
- Madness from the Inconstant Moon: A Collection of Short Works from Larry Niven (April 2017)

== Graphic novels and comics adaptations ==
- "Not Long before the End" was adapted by Doug Moench and Vicente Alcazar (May 1975), and "All the Myriad Ways" by writer-artist Howard Chaykin (Sep 1975), both for Marvel Comics' black-and-white anthology magazine Unknown Worlds of Science Fiction.
- The Magic Goes Away, graphic novel by Paul Kupperberg (writer) and Jan Duursema (artist), DC Comics (1986)
- A.R.M. (1990, Malibu Comics), adaptation of Death by Ecstasy
- Death by Ecstasy: Illustrated Adaptation of the Larry Niven Novella (1991)
- Green Lantern: Ganthet's Tale (1992, DC Comics, ISBN 1-56389-026-7) (with John Byrne)
- Ringworld: The Graphic Novel (2014, Tor), adapted by Robert Mandell and drawn by Sean Lam
- Ringworld: The Graphic Novel, Part Two (2015, Tor), adapted by Robert Mandell and drawn by Sean Lam
