= Stars and Gods =

2010 collection of science fiction and non-fiction by Larry Niven

- first edition of Stars and Gods
- Author: Larry Niven
- Cover artist: Getty Images
- Language: English
- Genre: Science fiction, non-fiction
- Publisher: Tor Books
- Publication date: 2010
- Publication place: United States
- Media type: Print (hardcover)
- Pages: 365 pp
- ISBN: 978-0-765-30864-1

Stars and Gods is a collection of science fiction and non-fiction by Larry Niven and edited by Jonathan Strahan. It was first published in hardcover and in ebook form by Tor Books in August 2010. A trade paperback edition was followed in August 2011 from the same publisher.

The book contains nine excerpts from longer works, fifteen works of short fiction, and seven short nonfictional works by Niven. A part of the book was written in collaboration with other authors, and it has a preface, fifteen introductions, and several of the pieces by the author. The book also includes an interview of Niven by Brenda Cooper.

== Contents ==
An asterisk indicates the piece is prefaced by an introduction by Niven.

- "Preface"
- Ringworld's Children (Chapters 1 and 2)
- Rainbow Mars (Chapters 18 and 19)*
- Escape from Hell (Seventh Circle, Third Round)* (with Jerry Pournelle)
- Burning Tower (Chapters 2 and 3)* (with Jerry Pournelle)
- Building Harlequin's Moon (Chapter 12)* (with Brenda Cooper)
- Fleet of Worlds (excerpt)* (with Edward M. Lerner)
- Juggler of Worlds (Edited Version of Chapter 59)* (with Edward M. Lerner)
- "Choosing Names"*
- "Fly-By-Night"*
- "The Hunting Park"*
- "After Mecca"
- "Cadet Amelia"
- "Cat Toy"
- "Chicxulub"
- "The Gatherers' Guild"
- "The Solipsist at Dinner"
- "Boys and Girls Together"
- "Traveler" (essay)
- "Rocket Men" (essay)
- "Wet Mars" (essay)
- Beowulf's Children (excerpt)* (with Steven Barnes and Jerry Pournelle)
- "Where Next, Columbus?" (essay)* (with Jerry Pournelle)
- Achilles' Choice (Chapters 15 and 16)* (with Steven Barnes)
- "Choosing Life"* (with Brenda Cooper)
- "Free Floaters" (with Brenda Cooper)
- "Finding Myself" (with Brenda Cooper)
- "The Missing Mass"*
- "Safe Harbor"*
- "Hooking the Reader" (essay)
- "Larry Niven Interview by Brenda Cooper in 2000 AD" (by Brenda Cooper)
- "Food Story for the Con Jose Program Book" (essay)
- "Inconstant Moon has Passed" (essay)
