= Scatterbrain (book) =

Collection of stories by Larry Niven

- First edition cover
- Author: Larry Niven
- Publisher: Tor Books
- Publication date: October 2003
- ISBN: 978-0-7653-0137-6

Scatterbrain is a 2003 collection of short stories, novel excerpts, and essays by American writer Larry Niven. It was a sequel to N-Space and Playgrounds of the Mind.

== Contents ==
1. Introduction: Where Do I Get My Crazy Ideas
2. Destiny's Road (Excerpt from the novel)
3. The Ringworld Throne (Excerpt from the novel)
4. The Woman in Del Ray Crater
5. Loki
6. Procrustes
7. Mars: Who Needs It? (Non-fiction for Space.com)
8. How to Save Civilization and Save a Little Money (Non-fiction for Space.com)
9. The Burning City (Excerpt from the novel, with Jerry Pournelle)
10. Saturn's Race (Excerpt from the novel, with Steven Barnes)
11. Ice and Mirrors (With Brenda Cooper)
12. Discussion with Brenda Cooper re: Ice and Mirrors
13. Smut Talk
14. Telepresence
15. Learning to Love the Space Station
16. Autograph Etiquette
17. Tabletop Fusion
18. Collaboration
19. Intercon Trip Report
20. Handicap
21. Did the Moon Move for You, Too?
22. Hugo Awards Anecdotes
23. Introduction to Pete Hamilton story Watching Trees Grow
24. Introductory material for Man-Kzin Wars II.
25. Canon for the Man-Kzin Wars
26. Epilogue: What I Tell Librarians
