= The Best of Larry Niven =

2010 collection of stories by Larry Niven and edited by Jonathan Strahan

- First edition
- Author: Larry Niven
- Cover artist: Edward Miller
- Language: English
- Genre: Science fiction
- Publisher: Subterranean Press
- Publication date: 2010
- Publication place: United States
- Media type: Print (hardcover)
- Pages: 618 pp
- ISBN: 978-1-59606-331-0

The Best of Larry Niven is a collection of science fiction and fantasy stories written by Larry Niven and edited by Jonathan Strahan, first published in hardcover by Subterranean Press in December 2010. The pieces were originally published between 1965 and 2000 in the magazines The Magazine of Fantasy and Science Fiction, If, Ellery Queen's Mystery Magazine, Galaxy Magazine, Knight, Analog Science Fiction/Science Fact, Vertex: the Magazine of Science Fiction, Isaac Asimov's Science Fiction Magazine, Omni and Playboy, the anthologies Dangerous Visions, Quark/4, Ten Tomorrows, and What Might Have Been? Volume 1: Alternate Empires, the novel The Magic Goes Away, and the collections All the Myriad Ways and The Flight of the Horse.

The book contains twenty-five short stories, novelettes and novellas, one novel, and one essay by the author, together with an introduction by Jerry Pournelle.

== Contents ==
- "Introduction" (Jerry Pournelle)
- "Becalmed in Hell"
- "Bordered in Black"
- "Neutron Star"
- "The Soft Weapon"
- "The Jigsaw Man"
- "The Deadlier Weapon"
- "All the Myriad Ways"
- "Not Long Before the End"
- "Man of Steel, Woman of Kleenex"
- "Inconstant Moon"
- "Rammer"
- "Cloak of Anarchy"
- "The Fourth Profession"
- "Flash Crowd"
- "The Defenseless Dead"
- "The Flight of the Horse"
- "The Hole Man"
- "Night on Mispec Moor"
- "Flatlander"
- "The Magic Goes Away"
- "Cautionary Tales"
- "Limits"
- "A Teardrop Falls"
- "The Return of William Proxmire"
- "The Borderland of Sol"
- "Smut Talk"
- "The Missing Mass"
