= Dream Park: The Roleplaying Game =

Tabletop role-playing game

Dream Park
The Roleplaying Game
- Designers: Mike Pondsmith
- Publishers: R. Talsorian Games
- Publication: 1992; 33 years ago
- Genres: Science fiction
- Systems: Basic Role-Playing

Dream Park: The Roleplaying Game is a role-playing game published by R. Talsorian Games in 1992. It was designed by Mike Pondsmith and was based on the 1981 novel Dream Park by Larry Niven and Steven Barnes, which is itself about a live-action role-playing game amusement park. The player characters take on the roles of the players in this holographic game, simultaneously playing both the character and the character's alternate persona.

== Description ==
In 1981, Larry Niven and Steven Barnes wrote the novel Dream Park, which describes a murder investigation that takes place within a televised live action role-playing game (LARP) set in a holographic amusement park. In 1992, R. Talsorian Games published Dream Park, a 128-page softcover book by Mike Pondsmith with rules for a pencil-and-paper role-playing game based on the novel (making it a role-playing game based on a book about a role-playing game).

== Gameplay ==
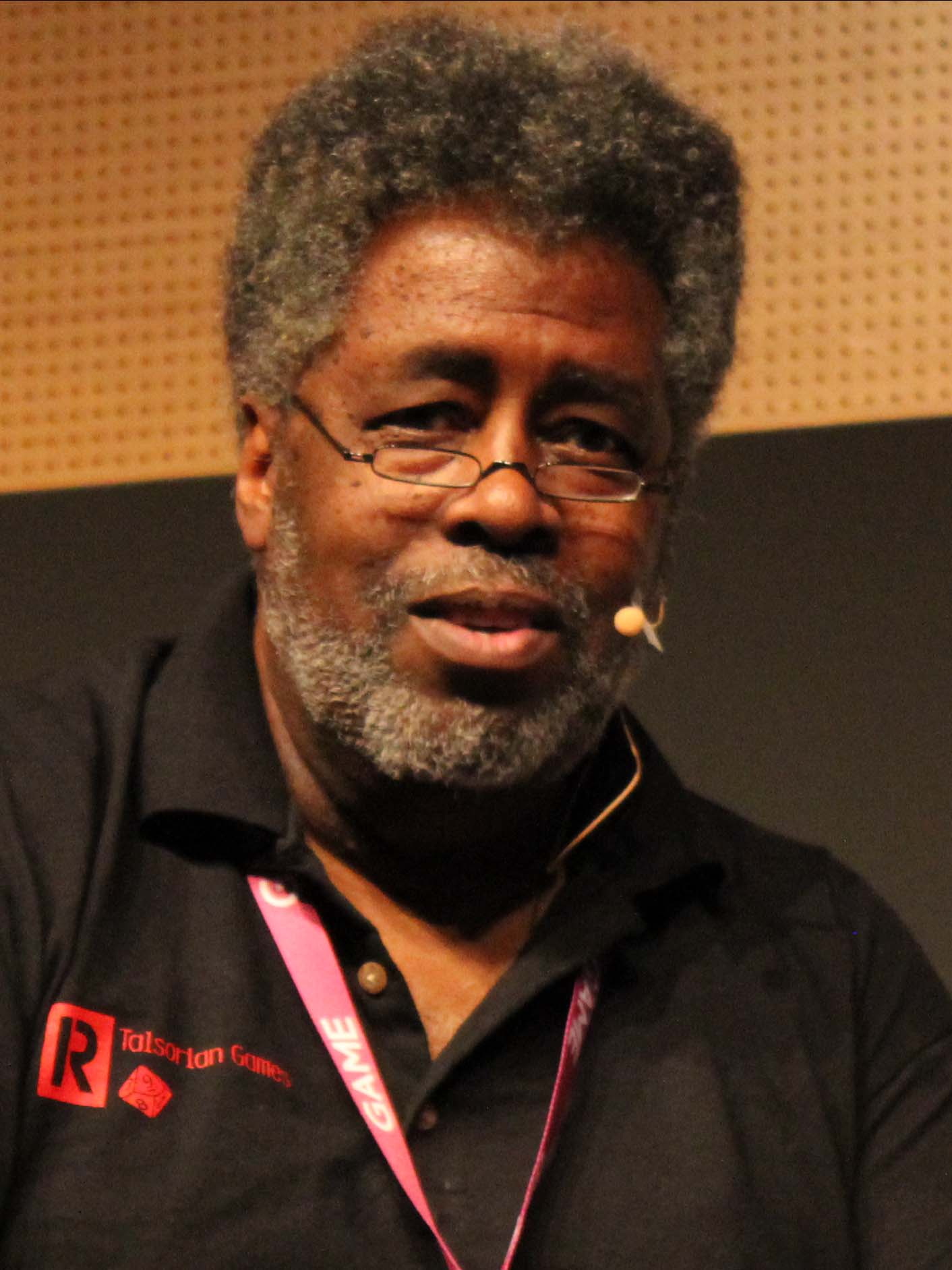
The game was designed by Mike Pondsmith (pictured in 2017).

The premise of the game is that the player takes on the role of a primary character who wants to LARP at Dream Park, a holographic amusement park. In order to do this, the primary character takes on the role of a persona for each session within Dream Park. Thus the player takes on two roles: the primary character, and the Dream Park persona being played by the primary character. The rule book has a basic rules section with a few short scenarios and more detailed advanced rules, as well as information on various types of genres and creating games.

The rule book encourages the gamemaster to create Dream Park sessions that are mash-ups of various eras and genres. The sample adventure offered in the rule book, The Big Zombie Pirate Game, involves pirates, submarines and zombie dinosaurs.

Character generation is two-fold: The player first creates a primary character, usually a fairly ordinary person. The primary character then creates a Dream Park persona that the primary character will use in the Dream Park game within the overall game. This persona can be one of several classes: fighter, thief, cleric, magic-user, loremaster, engineer, psychic, superhero, or multi-class (two classes).

The Dream Park persona's in-game abilities are defined by ten skills that are rated from 1–4: melee weapon, ranged weapon, hand to hand (used for unarmed attacks), dodge, tinkering, athletics, knowledge, stealth, willpower, and awareness. The primary character also has 20 Game Points that can be spent on Dream Park options: magic spells, super powers, weapons and animal companions.

Before the first Dream Park session begins, the primary character is taken on a tour of Dream Park, where several of the staff explain their job. The head special effects technician gives a behind the scenes look at how the special effects of the park work.

Dream Park sessions are set in one of four eras:

- Ancient (Dark Ages and earlier)
- Historical (Renaissance to 1900)
- Modern (1900 to mid-21st century)
- Future (mid-21st century and beyond).

For an upcoming Dream Park session, the primary character can use any banked Game Points, as well as cashing in any unneeded equipment and optional abilities used in a previous Dream Park session, to buy new equipment and optional abilities that will conform to the era of the new session. So a fighter persona who had been a sword-wielding knight in a medieval Dream Park session might be an M1-toting GI in another session set in the mid-twentieth century.

Skill challenges are resolved with a single six-sided die roll. The referee assigns a difficulty rating to the task. The player succeeds at the task if a die roll plus the Dream Park persona's relevant skill rating exceeds the difficulty rating of the task.

Combat resolution is similar: An attacker rolls a single die, which is then modified by the relevant skill, distance, target size and visual impairment. The total must surpass the target's Dodge or Parry skill. Wounds are resolved on a table, although damage is reduced by the target's armor. A Dream Park persona who receives too many wounds and "dies" is removed from the Dream Park session; the primary character can be penalized Game Points by the referee, although the referee also has the option of making no Game Point penalty as a reward for enthusiastic role-playing prior to the persona's "death".

== Supplements ==
- Dream Park Gamemaster Pack
- The Fiendish Agents of Falkenberg

== Reception ==
Stewart Wieck reviewed Dream Park in White Wolf #32 (July/Aug., 1992), rating it a 3 out of 5 and stated that "In essence, Dream Park is a solid game that does an admirable job of presenting a concept flawed for roleplaying use. This game is best left to a live-action format."

In Issue 70 of Challenge, Dirk DeJong found that "Dream Park is an attractive, very glossy product. It's easy to play the basic game, and the fundamental concepts are swiftly grasped." However, DeJong found discrepancies between the rules and the original novels, especially the magic system, which he felt players might object to. He concluded, "Dream Park is a good concept, and well-executed. Gamers desiring different game realities, new challenges and little chance of permanent character death will love it. I look forward to the adventures."

In the August 1993 edition of Dragon (Issue 196), Rick Swan admitted that "in small doses, this game can be a lot of fun." But he was unenthusiastic about it as an on-going campaign, saying, "The Dream Park game is not a serious simulation, nor is it suited for long-term play. The quirky premise sacrifices character development and strong narratives in favor of action and elementary problem-solving. Role-playing has little place in these cartoonish scenarios, and it’s unlikely that players will become attached to characters who change their skills as often as they change their clothes."

In a reader poll conducted by the UK magazine Arcane in 1996 to determine the 50 most popular roleplaying games of all time, Dream Park was ranked 34th. Editor Paul Pettengale commented: "You can run a continuing character – the gameworld player - while playing in a string of scenarios, and even if you get killed your character isn't dead, just embarrassed or annoyed. The D6-based system is simple and the published scenarios are colourful."

== Reviews ==
- Casus Belli #72 (Nov 1992)
- Polyhedron #86
