= Scatterbrain =

Scatterbrain may refer to:

== Music ==
=== Musicians ===
- Scatterbrain (band), an American thrash metal band, active 1989 to 1994
- Scatterbrain (project), a solo project launched in 2026 by American musician Brian Burkheiser

=== Albums ===
- Scatterbrain (The Xcerts album),2010
- Scatterbrain (KXM album), 2017
- Scatterbrain, a 2021 album by The Chills

=== Songs ===
- "Scatterbrain", a B-side to "The Final Peace" by Jeff Beck
- "Scatterbrain", a song on Radiohead's 2003 album, Hail to the Thief
- "Scatterbrain", a song by Andrew Blythe commonly used in Playhouse Disney promotions

== Comics ==
- Scatterbrain (Morituri), a character from the Marvel Comics series Strikeforce Morituri
- Scatterbrain, the original alias used by the Image Comics character Ramjet (Image Comics)
- Scatterbrain, a Marvel UK/Marvel Comics character who used the alias when a member of Technet
- Scatterbrain (Dark Horse Comics), a 1988 horror comics anthology from Dark Horse Comics
- Scatterbrain, a limited series from Markosia

== Other uses ==
- Scatterbrain (book), by Larry Niven, published in 2003
- Scatterbrain (film), a 1940 film starring Judy Canova
