= Zulu Heart =

2003 novel by Steven Barnes

- Author: Steven Barnes
- Language: English
- Genre: Alternate history
- Publisher: Warner Aspect
- Publication date: 2003
- Publication place: United States
- Pages: 480 (hardcover)
- ISBN: 978-0-446-53122-1
- OCLC: 50912769
- Dewey Decimal: 813/.54 21
- LC Class: PS3552.A6954 Z85 2003
- Preceded by: Lion's Blood
- Followed by: Bronze Nile (upcoming)

Zulu Heart is a 2003 alternate history novel by Steven Barnes, a sequel to the 2002 book, Lion's Blood.

== Plot ==
Zulu Heart is set in an alternate world where an Islamic Africa became the dominant world power and Europe remained primitive. It continues the story of a young African nobleman, Kai ibn Jallaleddin ibn Rashid al Kushi, and his former slave, the Irishman Aidan O'Dere.
