= Bigger Than Worlds =

1974 essay by Larry Niven

"Bigger Than Worlds" is an essay by the American science fiction writer Larry Niven (born 1938). It was first published in March 1974 in Analog magazine, and has been anthologized in A Hole in Space (1974) and in Playgrounds of the Mind (1991). It reviews a number of proposals, not inconsistent with the known laws of physics, which have been made for habitable artificial astronomical megastructures.

== Sections ==
After an introduction saying that everyone may not always live on a single planet, the essay is divided into (mostly short) sections having the following titles and brief descriptions:

The Multi-Generation Ship

A generation ship is a slower-than-light spaceship housing some hundreds of people which takes several human generations to complete its journey. It could in principle be built using known technology.

Gravity

Niven can conceive of four ways of generating artificial gravity in a spaceship: (1) centrifugal force; (2) adding mass, e.g. neutronium or a black hole (this would incur serious penalties in fuel consumption); (3) gravity waves; and (4) continuous linear acceleration to the midway point of a journey, followed by continuous deceleration.

Flying Cities

These were proposed by James Blish (1921–75) in his novel sequence Cities in Flight (1956–62); they used an as-yet-undiscovered means of propulsion. As an alternative to Blish's idea of launching existing cities into space, Niven proposes a giant annular spaceship, which rotates to generate artificial gravity.

Inside Outside

This describes a hollowed-out planetoid, with living quarters inside.

Macro-Life

Any of the foregoing could be made self-sufficient and a permanent habitation, enlarged by materials obtained from planetary systems.

Worlds

Niven introduces the concept of engineering and terraforming whole planets.

Dyson Spheres

A Dyson sphere is a hollow spherical megastructure that completely encompasses a star. The inside surface is inhabited. The structure need not be a complete sphere; as, for example, in Niven's novel Ringworld (1970). In that conception, a solid ring with a radius of perhaps 1 AU surrounds a star, and is spun like a bicycle wheel to provide centripetal force instead of gravity. A star could be provided with rings of different diameters each occupying a different plane.

Dyson Spheres II

A Dyson structure could rotate to generate artificial gravity. Alternatively, one could do without gravity and live in free fall by inhabiting the space between two concentric Dyson spheres.

Hold It A Minute

The mathematics are plausible; the materials of construction are unknown.

The Disc

An Alderson disk is a platter of diameter similar to that of the orbits of Mars or Jupiter, with a star occupying a hole in its center.

Cosmic Macaroni

In a topopolis, a star is surrounded by a toroidal tube, which rotates around its internal circular axis to generate artificial gravity by centrifugal force. The structure need not be circular: it could be more complex, consisting of multiple loops around the star. Sufficient loops produce an aegagropilous topopolis (from the Greek word for 'furball', originally one made of goat hair). If scaled up to surround a galactic core rather than a single star, it is an aegagropilous galactopolis.

The Megasphere

A Dyson sphere contains the heart of a galaxy. The outside surface is the biosphere; the stars inside the source of energy. Surface gravity is minute, so that ability to live in free fall would be necessary. The atmosphere would not thin out for scores of light-years, so that structures such as ringworlds could be installed around the megasphere itself.

Finally, Niven notes that a rotating ringworld equipped with conducting surfaces could set up enormous magnetic forces acting on the star, which could be used to control its burning and to force it to emit a jet of gas along the system's axis. The star would become its own space drive, towing the ringworld along by gravity. By the time the star was used up, the system would be moving at sufficient speed to use interstellar gas as fuel for a Bussard ramjet. Such a megastructure would be impossible to land, and only useful if fleeing a galaxy-wide disaster.
