= Slashdot effect =

Increase in traffic caused by links

The Slashdot effect, also known as slashdotting or the hug of death, occurs when a popular website links to a smaller website, causing a massive increase in traffic. This overloads the smaller site, causing it to slow down or even temporarily become unavailable. Typically, less robust sites are unable to cope with the huge increase in traffic and become unavailable – common causes are lack of sufficient data bandwidth, servers that fail to cope with the high number of requests, and traffic quotas. Sites that are maintained on shared hosting services often fail when confronted with the Slashdot effect. This has the same effect as a denial-of-service attack, albeit accidentally. The name stems from the huge influx of web traffic which would result from the technology news site Slashdot linking to websites. The term flash crowd is a more generic term.

The original circumstances have changed, as flash crowds from Slashdot were reported in 2005 to be diminishing due to competition from similar sites, and the general adoption of elastically scalable cloud hosting platforms.

== Terminology ==
The term "Slashdot effect" refers to the phenomenon of a website becoming virtually unreachable because too many people are hitting it after the site was mentioned in an interesting article on the popular Slashdot news service. It was later extended to describe any similar effect from being listed on a popular site.

The effect has been associated with other websites or metablogs such as Hacker News, Fark, Digg, Drudge Report, Imgur, Reddit, and Twitter, leading to terms such as being farked or drudged, being under the Reddit effect, or receiving a hug of death from the site in question. Another generic term, "flash crowd," originates from Larry Niven's 1973 novella by that name, in which the invention of inexpensive teleportation allows crowds to materialize almost instantly at the sites of interesting news stories.

== Cause ==
Sites such as Slashdot, Digg, Reddit, StumbleUpon, and Fark consist of brief submitted stories and a self-moderated discussion on each story. The typical submission introduces a news item or website of interest by linking to it. In response, large masses of readers tend to simultaneously rush to view the referenced sites. The ensuing flood of page requests from readers can exceed the site's available bandwidth or the ability of its servers to respond, and render the site temporarily unreachable.

Google Doodles, which link to search results on the doodle topic, also result in high increases of traffic from the search results page.

== Extent ==
MRTG graph from a web server statistics generator showing a moderate Slashdot effect in action in 2005

Major news sites or corporate websites are typically engineered to serve large numbers of requests and therefore do not normally exhibit this effect. Websites that fall victim may be hosted on home servers, offer large images or movie files or have inefficiently generated dynamic content (e.g. many database hits for every web hit even if all web hits are requesting the same page). These websites often became unavailable within a few minutes of a story's appearance, even before any comments had been posted. Occasionally, paying Slashdot subscribers (who have access to stories before non-paying users) rendered a site unavailable even before the story was posted for the general readership.

Few definitive numbers exist regarding the precise magnitude of the Slashdot effect, but estimates put the peak of the mass influx of page requests at anywhere from several hundred to several thousand hits per minute. The flood usually peaked when the article was at the top of the site's front page and gradually subsided as the story was superseded by newer items. Traffic usually remained at elevated levels until the article was pushed off the front page, which could take from 12 to 18 hours after its initial posting. However, some articles had significantly longer lifetimes due to the popularity, newsworthiness, or interest in the linked article.

By 2005, reporters were commenting that the Slashdot effect had been diminishing. However, the effect has been seen involving Twitter when some popular users mention a website.

When the targeted website has a community-based structure, the term can also refer to the secondary effect of having a large group of new users suddenly set up accounts and start to participate in the community. While in some cases this has been considered a good thing, in others it is viewed with disdain by the prior members, as quite often the sheer number of new people brings many of the unwanted aspects of Slashdot along with it, such as trolling, vandalism, and newbie-like behavior. This bears some similarity to the 1990s Usenet concept of Eternal September.

== Assistance and prevention ==
Many solutions have been proposed for sites to deal with the Slashdot effect.

There are several systems that automatically mirror any Slashdot-linked pages to ensure that the content remains available even if the original site becomes unresponsive. Sites in the process of being Slashdotted may be able to mitigate the effect by temporarily redirecting requests for the targeted pages to one of these mirrors. Slashdot does not mirror the sites it links to on its own servers, nor does it endorse a third party solution. Mirroring of content may constitute a breach of copyright and, in many cases, cause ad revenue to be lost for the targeted site.

== See also ==
- Denial-of-service attack
- Streisand effect
- Web traffic
