= The Silver Ship and the Sea =

2007 novel by Brenda Cooper

The Silver Ship and the Sea is a young-adult science-fiction novel by Brenda Cooper, published in 2007. In 2008, it won the Endeavour Award, and was also one of Booklist's Adult Books for Young Adults Winners.

The Silver Ship and the Sea is the first book in a series. The other two books are Reading the Wind and Wings of Creation. Critical response to The Silver Ship and the Sea was generally positive. Writing in Analog, Richard Foss criticized the pacing of the next book, "Reading the Wind".

The book is about six genetically altered children who have been left on the planet Fremont after a war. They were often mistreated because they descended from the altered who fought against the humans. These altered were stronger and faster, with better reflexes and sharper senses than the normal humans of Fremont.

== Synopsis ==
In The Silver Ship and the Sea, there are six altered children: Chelo Lee, her brother Joseph, Kayleen, Bryan, Alicia, and Liam. Fremont had a single town, Artistos, where most of the people lived. There were also two bands of "Roamers": the east band and the west band. These travel around studying plants and animals. Chelo and Joseph lived with Artistos' leaders while Kayleen and Bryan lived with other families in the town. Liam went to the West Band, while Alicia was sent with the East Band.

The book starts with Chelo narrating, telling how her brother Joseph, and her friend Kayleen, could hold "data streams" and could fix data networks. Joseph, especially, could use the data networks to sense people and predators in remote places, and see events such as crashing meteors. Chelo and Joseph's adoptive parents were out hunting with others when they were killed by an earthquake. The earthquake also caused much damage to Artistos. After this experience, Joseph was weak and shaken, and unable to do what he used to.

Soon the East and West bands met in Artistos. Liam was treated better than anyone else, but Alicia had been accused of murder by Ruth, the East Band's leader. Judgment was reserved, and while Liam left with his adoptive father (and band's leader) Akashi, Alicia stayed. Bryan, who possessed enormous strength, was kept in Artistos. Tom and Paloma (2 people in Artistos sympathetic to the altered) took Joseph, Chelo, Kayleen and Alicia out of Artistos in an attempt to heal Joseph. Jenna, an altered adult who was left on Fremont, showed the four children around the battle headquarters of the altered. Joseph was completely healed with a help of "reading thread", and much more powerful than before. Jenna revealed to them their genemods (what they were altered to specialize in). Liam and Akashi soon joined them. They learned that Bryan had been severely hurt in a fight at Artistos, and was locked up. Joseph (who had learned that he could fly a ship) along with Jenna, Alicia, and Bryan (who was returned after Alicia threatened the people of Artistos with altered weaponry) left on the silver spaceship the New Making, while Chelo, Liam and Kayleen stayed behind. Chelo joined Liam in the West Band, and Kayleen remained with Paloma in Artistos.

== Development and Themes ==
The Silver Ship and the Sea is Cooper's second novel. Cooper began writing the novel shortly after the September 11 attacks upon the United States. The beginning of the second Iraq War, which the author did not support, was a major influence in the development of the novel. The author Larry Niven also had a direct impact on Cooper's work.

Largely concerned with ethics, major thematic elements of the novel are war and new technology, such as genetic engineering, nanotechnology and artificial intelligence.

== Characters ==
The following are major characters within the series:

- Chelo Lee: 17-year-old altered girl with genetic modifications (genemods) as a caretaker, planner, and strategist.
- Joseph Lee: 14-year-old altered boy with genemods to hold "data streams" and a spaceship flyer.
- Kayleen: 15-year-old altered girl with genemods to hold "data streams", and an exceptional runner.
- Bryan: 15-year-old altered boy with genemods as a warrior/fighter, with enormous strength.
- Liam: 16-year-old altered boy with genemods as a leader and strategist, and a quick learner.
- Alicia: 16-year-old altered girl with genemods as a risk-taker and (in a way) a fighter.
- Jenna: a crippled (but agile and strong) altered adult left behind on Fremont, who trained the children.
- Akashi: West Band leader, adoptive father of Liam, kind to altered.
- Paloma: Artistos resident, adoptive mother of Kayleen, kind to altered.
- Tom: Artistos resident, caretaker of Chelo and Joseph after the earthquake, kind to altered.
- Nava: Leader of Artistos after the earthquake, unkind to altered.
- Ruth: Leader of the East Band, extremely dislikes altered.

== Other books in the series ==
There are currently two other books in the series, Reading the Wind and Wings of Creation. A fourth book The Making War was projected. According to an interview by MilSciFi.com, the author did not originally plan to make the first book into a series.

=== Reading the Wind ===
Kayleen takes Liam and Chelo to the other continent Islandia, where they discover the mercenaries that have been hired to wipe out Fremont. Meanwhile, Joseph (who was an extremely powerful wind reader) and the others reach Silver's Home, and he is trained by someone called Marcus. When they find out about the mercenaries, they return to help battle them.

=== Wings of Creation ===
This book was released in November 2009. The protagonists in the novel are working to avert an interplanetary war.
