= Lion's Blood =

2002 novel by Steven Barnes

- Author: Steven Barnes
- Language: English
- Genre: Alternate History
- Publisher: Warner Aspect
- Publication date: 2002
- Publication place: United States
- Media type: Print
- Pages: 461 (hardcover)
- ISBN: 978-0-446-52668-5
- OCLC: 47767295
- Dewey Decimal: 813/.54 21
- LC Class: PS3552.A6954 L56 2002
- Followed by: Zulu Heart

Lion's Blood is a 2002 alternate history novel by American writer Steven Barnes. The book won the 2003 Endeavour Award. It is followed by the sequel Zulu Heart.

The novel presents an alternate world where an Islamic Africa is the center of technological progress and learning while Europe remains largely tribal and backward. Throughout the novel, both the Gregorian calendar and the Islamic Hijri calendar are used.

The title draws its name from Abu Ali's sacred knife, which is called Lion's Blood (or "Nasab Asad" in Arabic), which was carried into battle by members of Abu Ali's family for ten generations. It is made of "razor-sharp steel and bone…Its hilt was crafted of black rhino horn, bolted to the tang with six heavy steel rivets. Legend held that the steel blade was smelted from a fallen meteorite by Benin smiths, its white-hot length quenched in the living blood of a lion".

== Plot ==
The story begins with Aidan O'Dere, a White European child growing up in a primitive 19th century Ireland with his pagan father, Christian mother, and his twin sister. Their village is attacked by Vikings and Aidan's father is killed in the battle, while Aidan and the rest of his family are taken as slaves. They are later sold to black slave merchants in Andalus and taken to Bilalistan (southeastern North America) by the Middle Passage. Many die along the way and Aidan's mother suffers a miscarriage. During the voyage, Aidan swears to his sister that if they are separated, he will find her.

There at a slave auction Aidan's sister is separated from them and sold off as a maidservant, while Aidan and his mother are sold to a Wakil named Abu Ali Jallaleddin ibn Rashid al Kushi, owner of a plantation called Dar Kush. Dar Kush is known for its lenient treatment of the white slaves, going as far as allowing them to keep their native religion, culture, and language.

The Wakil has three children: Ali, the oldest son; Elenya, the youngest child and only daughter; and the middle child and younger son Kai, an awkward, shy boy who feels that he will never live up to his father's expectations. One day Kai and Aidan meet and become unlikely friends. Aidan aids Kai in a prank that gets him whipped, but Kai saves him from most of the punishment and selects him as his footboy/servant. Despite their difference in status, the boys develop a strong friendship.

Kai and Aidan grow up together and remain close, until a half-Andalusian Moor, half-Greek slave girl who was a gift to Kai comes between them. The break happens when the girl falls in love with Aidan, leading to a fight between the two. Though Kai has better fighting skills achieved via formal training, Aiden is far stronger, with greater punching power and endurance, achieved from several years of grueling labor. As a result, Aidan defeats Kai. Though angry and humiliated, Kai does not punish them further and allows the two to be together.

Both boys go through several changes as they become adults. Kai converts to Sufism, begins to have feelings for his brother's betrothed, finds himself about to be in an arranged marriage with a Zulu princess, and begins to question the practice of slavery. Aidan, finally with something worth fighting for, begins to chafe at the bonds of his slavery, which drives a wedge further between the two friends. After his (also enslaved) wife and newborn son are transferred away to the plantation of Kai's uncle, Aidan becomes involved in a slave revolt among the slaves of Dar Kush and neighboring plantations. Using the revolt as cover, Aidan and other slaves attempt to flee, but are captured and Aidan's infant son almost dies. Aidan, however, is again spared punishment by Kai, who is mourning the death of his father in the revolt.

Later Bilalistan finds itself at war with the Aztecs over a treasured Bilalian landmark, Mosque Al'Amu (the Shrine of the Fathers), which stands at the border between Bilalistan and Aztec territory. Both Kai and Aidan join the army heading to meet them. During the last stand at the Shrine of the Fathers, Kai takes leadership of the armies after the Zulus abandon the battle due to the suspicious deaths of their leader, Shaka Zulu, and Kai's elder brother Ali. Promising freedom to all of the slaves who came with the army, the Bilalians manage a victory by destroying the Shrine of the Fathers with most of the surviving Aztec forces inside it.

Kai, now a war hero, keeps his promise to free all of the slaves who fought along with their families. On returning home he finds that his uncle has taken Aidan's wife as an unwilling lover and refuses to free her, forcing Kai into a duel with him which results in the death of Kai's uncle. Kai, now the only surviving male in his family, takes his place as the Wakil of Dar Kush, while Aidan and his family leave to start a new life as freedmen and freedwomen.

== Characters ==
Aidan O’Dere - Aidan is an Irish slave in New Djibouti. He grew up in the O’Dere crannog in Eire, was captured by Viking raiders when he was a boy, and was sold into slavery. Within his first year as a slave at the estate of Abu Ali, he befriends Kai and becomes his footboy.

Nessa O’Dere – Nessa is Aidan's twin sister, separated from Aidan and their mother upon reaching the slave auction block in Bilalistan.

Deirdre O’Dere – Deirdre is Aidan and Nessa's mother. Unlike her husband who is a Druid, Deirdre is a Christian. She suffers a miscarriage during the middle passage but convinces the slave auctioneers to keep Aidan with her by demonstrating her ability to write.

Mahon O’Dere – Mahon is Aidan and Nessa's father, a fisherman, and the Chieftain of the O’Dere crannog. He is killed by Viking raiders when they come to capture slaves.

Abu Ali Jallaleddin ibn Rashid al Kushi – Abu Ali is a Wakil in New Djibouti, immensely wealthy, and second only to the governor in power. Abu Ali is of Ethiopian descent, from the Aderi tribe of Harar. He owns a massive plantation, Dar Kush, as well as over 200 slaves.

Ali ibn Jallaleddin ibn Rashid – Ali is the eldest son of Abu Ali, expected to inherit his father's plantation and senate seat, and is trained as a warrior. He is betrothed to Lamiya Mesgana, the niece of the Empress, in a political marriage.

Kai ibn Jallaleddin ibn Rashid – Kai is the second son of Abu Ali, and more interested in books than in battle. He is the same age as Aidan and befriends him after Aidan takes the blame for a prank Kai devises, making him his footboy.

Elenya bint Jallaleddin ibn Rashid – Elenya is the youngest of Abu Ali's three children, and a satranj prodigy from a young age (a game similar to chess).

Malik ibn Rashid al Kushi – Malik is Abu Ali's younger brother, and a powerful warrior who earned himself the nickname of "Al Nasab" (The Lion).

Shaka kaSenzangakhona (Shaka Zulu) – Shaka is the chief of the Zulu, an army colonel and fierce warrior, and the most powerful non-Muslim in New Djibouti.

== Musical connection ==
Heather Alexander's album Insh'Allah is based on Lion's Blood. The two were written concurrently, and the book quotes lyrics from several of the songs.

== See also ==
- Imaro by Charles R. Saunders
- Through Darkest Europe by Harry Turtledove
- The Years of Rice and Salt by Kim Stanley Robinson
- The Mirage by Matt Ruff
