= Dream Park =

1981 novel by Larry Niven & Steven Barnes

- First (limited) edition
- Author: Larry Niven; Steven Barnes
- Cover artist: Rowena Morrill
- Language: English
- Genre: Science fiction
- Publisher: Phantasia Press
- Publication date: 1981
- Publication place: United States
- Media type: Print
- Pages: 436
- ISBN: 0-932096-09-3

Dream Park is a 1981 sci-fi/murder mystery novel by American writers Larry Niven and Steven Barnes, set in a futuristic amusement park of the same name. It was nominated for the 1982 Locus Award and later expanded into a series of cyberpunk murder mysteries: The Barsoom Project (1989), The California Voodoo Game (1992), and The Moon Maze Game (2011). The books describe a futuristic form of live action role-playing games (LARPs), although the term was not in use when the original novel was published. The novels inspired many LARP groups, notably the International Fantasy Games Society which is named after a fictional entity in the book.

== Overview ==
The Dream Park series is set in a near-future Earth, the first book taking place in March 2051. Technology is used to create realistic games in which participants act out the roles of free-willed protagonists in various stories. These are role-playing games and foreshadowed many aspects of modern live action role-playing games.

Many elements of the Dream Park games will be familiar to players of traditional pen-and-paper role playing games, such as Dungeons & Dragons. The novels are replete with references to dice rolls, character sheets, and experience points, although there's no mention of anyone playing pen-and-paper (just video games). Most of the classic character classes (fighter, mage, thief, and cleric) are still in use, although "engineer" and "scout" are added in.

The most obvious difference between the games and modern LARP is one of budget and scale. Most Dream Park games use massive, elaborately decorated, climate controlled sets, that cover thousands of acres. In one novel, an entire island is created for the game; in another, a crater on the Moon is domed and heavily developed. Holograms (and later augmented reality glasses) are used for special effects. The blades on sharp weapons can be removed and replaced with holographic edges; this allows participants to engage in safe combat. A combination of computers and gamemasters monitor events, prompt actors playing non-protagonist parts, and resolve simulated actions. Thus, after a player's character has been repeatedly struck with a holographic sword a computer might determine that he has died. The player will be informed that he should pantomime a death and is removed from play.

Although the Dream Park concept assumes future technology, it is still an expensive proposition. Players pay fees to play the games. In addition, the first game played is both broadcast live and recorded (the game areas and player costumes include numerous cameras and other sensors). The creator of the game takes the recorded footage and edits it into a movie (with enhanced post-production effects) and other media for resale. While the resulting movies are heavily influenced by the game's creator, the actions of the players are unscripted. In this way the books anticipate reality television.

The games in the Dream Park series are heavily regulated. One of the regulatory groups is the International Fantasy Games Society or IFGS. The creator of a game (called the Game Master) has nearly unlimited power in the game; he can in theory arbitrarily change a game to kill out a given character and eject the player from the game. IFGS existed to protect the interests of players and limit abuse by game creators. One group of fantasy based live action role-playing gamers have taken the IFGS name for their rules and organization.

In each of the novels, the plot moves at multiple levels. The reader is given parallel stories involving the game story itself as the player characters learn the scenario, solve various puzzles and engage in simulated battles with enemies; the players and their real-world relationships with each other and the game organizers; events affecting the venue staff; and usually some kind of out-of-game plot or conspiracy that will impact everyone involved. These are high-stakes games with massive publicity and cutting-edge technology, and they are therefore attractive to a variety of criminals.

== Plot ==
Dream Park is a combination amusement park and live action roleplaying game center, the largest in the world. Most Games are reruns, with team after team of players attempting to complete the pre-packaged adventures and win Gaming Points to inprove the standing of their characters. But someone always has to be first – and every Gamer wants to be part of the initial team that beta-tests a new Game. To have the author/programmer himself serve as the Game Master, to face surprises no one has seen before – even the most jaded elite players compete fiercely for a spot in the Gaming party.

"South Seas Treasure Hunt" promises to be a doozy. The Game Master, Richard Lopez, is one of the best authors in the business. Chester Henderson, the Lore Master (team captain of the Players) is a living legend ... and the two hate each other. Players from around the world have gathered for a chance to play in the biggest grudge match in Gaming history.

The game opens with a bang. Henderson's team is sent to (simulated) Melanesia to retrieve some type of World War II-era superweapon, but dark magic rips their Gooney Bird out of the sky to a crash landing. The party has to fight their way across New Guinea, dealing with magic and monsters of kinds they have never seen before. Demigods, Cargo Cult magicians, and an army of laughing zombies stand between them and victory.

But even as Henderson's team hacks their way through the jungle, the real world threatens the Game. A multi-million dollar experimental prototype has been stolen from Dream Park's Research & Development Department, with a security guard murdered in the process. All the evidence suggests one of the Players in South Seas Treasure is responsible.

Caught between losing millions of dollars if the stolen prototype is not recovered, and the loss of millions if they stop the Game, Dream Park's senior executives hit on an unusual solution. Alex Griffin, Chief of Dream Park Security, will go undercover as a Player in the Game, using the optional Player slot always reserved by the Park in every Game but rarely used. The catch is Griffin has never played a Game before, much less one created by one of the best Game Masters in the world.

Solve a murder, recover the stolen prototype, help a bunch of crazies play dress-up in a fantasy without getting killed out of the Game; how hard can it be? Both Griffin and the readers will find out!

== Barsoom Project ==
The Fimbulwinter Game has a challenging reputation. Set in (simulated) Northern Alaska, it explores Inuit mythology, with the Gamers tasked with heading off a Lovecraftian cult's efforts to plunge the world into a new ice age. It was a tough but fair Game ... until one of the Players accidentally shot several people after an unmodified gun with live ammunition was mixed in with the harmless prop guns.

As a result, no one has played the Fimbulwinter Game in years. However, some enterprising individuals at Dream Park want to repackage it as a "Fat Ripper Special", the LARP equivalent of a diet and exercise program. The challenges are re-themed to compel the participants to improve their eating habits and rethink their lifestyles, be they eating unhealthily or dealing with anorexia. And so a team of (mostly) overweight weekend warriors set off to save the world, and perhaps themselves.

Meanwhile, apart from the Gaming area Dream Park has been closed to the public. The company is pitching investors on a mission to Mars, and some of the wealthiest people in the world are there to review the proposal (and have the theme park rides all to themselves).

But the "accident" all those years ago was no accident; the gun was deliberately planted in the Fimbulwinter Game. An old enemy has returned, lurking among the investors. Someone who looks at the Barsoom Proposal and sees only new ways to inflict global terror – and ruin Dream Park in the process.

That is not the only surprise. There is someone among the Gamers who shouldn't be there: someone whose life was ruined by the original Fimbulwinter Game. And so Alex Griffin has to invoke the use of the Park's reserved Player slot to put his second in command into the Game, not only to save the target among the potential investors in the Barsoom Project, but also to solve that murder from long ago.

== California Voodoo Game ==
Things have never been better for Dream Park. The Barsoom Project is in full swing and promises to be the greatest jewel in the company's corporate crown. Further, they are hosting this year's LARP "superbowl", where five competing teams will race each other to discover the secrets of an abandoned "post-apocalyptic" arcology way out in the desert. The California Voodoo Game promises to be so spectacular, it has lured some of the best players in the world out of retirement and caused the corporations sponsoring the five teams to hire the best current Gamers out there.

Even better, the arcology is scheduled to be repurposed as the center of the Barsoom Project once California Voodoo ends. Coupled with various tax incentives, the savings for Dream Parl's parent corporation promise to be equally astronomical.

Some of the players, though, have more on their mind than playing a Game created by the legendary Richard Lopez. One of the most ruthless and manipulative players ever, "the Bishop" is a living legend and self-proclaimed cheat. He has never been caught, though, and bringing him in as one of the five captains guarantees even more attention will be paid to this year's super-Game. But is he there to win, or for some other, more sinister purpose? Every interview he gives raises more eyebrows and questions.

As the Gamers prowl through the arcology, battling zombies, bargaining with voodoo gods, and befriending giant alien catfish, Alex Griffin's life falls apart. He has never really recovered from the corruption he unearthed during the South Seas Treasure and Fimbulwinter Games and the broken friendships that followed. Worse, Acacia Garcia, his former flame, is captain of one of the five corporate-sponsored teams; and she looks amazing. She may also be more interested in Tony McWhirter, who has completed his prison sentence and is now working for Griffin.

As head of Dream Park Security, Griffin gets a call from the police. His current girlfriend (and coworker) has been found murdered in a sleazy love hotel. A routine review of her computer records indicates that she was downloading files about California Voodoo mere hours before her death. In the Game, all of the teams are behaving oddly. Something is most definitely wrong.

So for the second time in his life, Alex Griffin must enter a running Game. This time, however, he is in as a non-player character. He suspects that Bishop is behind the problems within the Game. But first, the Griffin has to prove the Bishop is behind the troubles in the Game; second, he has to figure out how he is doing it; third, he has to find a way to stop him; and finally, he has to prove that Bishop is the one who killed his girlfriend and lover. Quite a challenge, even for The Griffin.

== Moon Maze Game ==
In The Moon Maze Game, Gamers travel to the Moon in 2085. Their game is set in the British Empire in the 19th century and takes place on the moon as imagined by H.G. Wells.

One of the Gamers is Prince Ali, heir to the ruler of the Republic of Kikaya. A group of mercenaries infiltrates the Gaming Dome to kidnap Ali in order to compel his father to step down from the throne. The Gamers, including Ali, are captured but manage to escape. Although the mercenaries have cut off communications between the Gaming Dome in Botanica Crater and the main Heinlein Station, visuals continue to broadcast as the Game turns into a real life pursuit and battle between the Gamers and the mercenaries, with life and death on the line for real.

== Cultural references ==
The novels Achilles' Choice and Saturn's Race, also by Niven and Barnes, are set in the 2020s and feature a quick reference to Dream Park technologies. The events of another novel, The Descent of Anansi, by the same authors, are referred to in the latter two books of the Dream Park trilogy.

The (real world) game show, The Crystal Maze, makes an appearance in The California Voodoo Game, with two of the "superbowl" teams challenging each other in a futuristic version as a warm-up for the titular Game.

== Theme park ==
In the mid-1990s a real company (Dream Park Corporation) took the Dream Park name to try to realize many of the ideas in the books. Their stated goal was a large theme park with ongoing minor events in which attendees could participate. They would also run the sort of immersive games described in the books. The company made a number of adjustments for limits to existing technology. Instead of holographic weapons, players had foam-rubber weapons. Plans were to attach sensors to the weapons and players. The sensors would beam information about strikes to computers that would track a simulated health for each character. Players would wear headsets, a radio allowing the computers and game masters to inform players of important status information. A head-up display on the headset would display special effects like a dragon's fiery breath or a magical spell.

The complete theme park was never built, though a fantasy dungeon was created and tested. The company eventually went bankrupt in 1997. The new attraction MagiQuest in Myrtle Beach, South Carolina follows a similar combat-less approach using electronically enhanced wands that interact with objects around the attraction.

== Role-playing game ==
A tabletop role-playing game was also produced under the title Dream Park (making it a role-playing game based on a book about a role-playing game). The book was written by Mike Pondsmith and published by R. Talsorian Games.

== Reception ==
Greg Costikyan reviewed Dream Park in Ares Magazine #11 and commented that "Dream Park is Niven's best novel in a long time. It shows flair and imagination not evident in, for example, The Magic Goes Away; the multi-level plot is more than intriguing enough to hold the reader's attention."

== Reviews ==
- Review by Baird Searles (1981) in Isaac Asimov's Science Fiction Magazine, March 16, 1981
- Review by Jeff Frane (1981) in Locus, #243 April 1981
- Review by Chris Henderson (1981) in Dragon Magazine, August 1981
- Review by Spider Robinson (1981) in Analog Science Fiction/Science Fact, August 17, 1981
- Review by Debbie Notkin (1981) in Rigel Science Fiction, #2 Fall 1981
- Review by Paul McGuire (1982) in Science Fiction Review, Winter 1982
- Review by Brian Smith (1982) in Paperback Inferno, Volume 6, Number 3
