= Topopolis =

Proposed tube-like space habitat

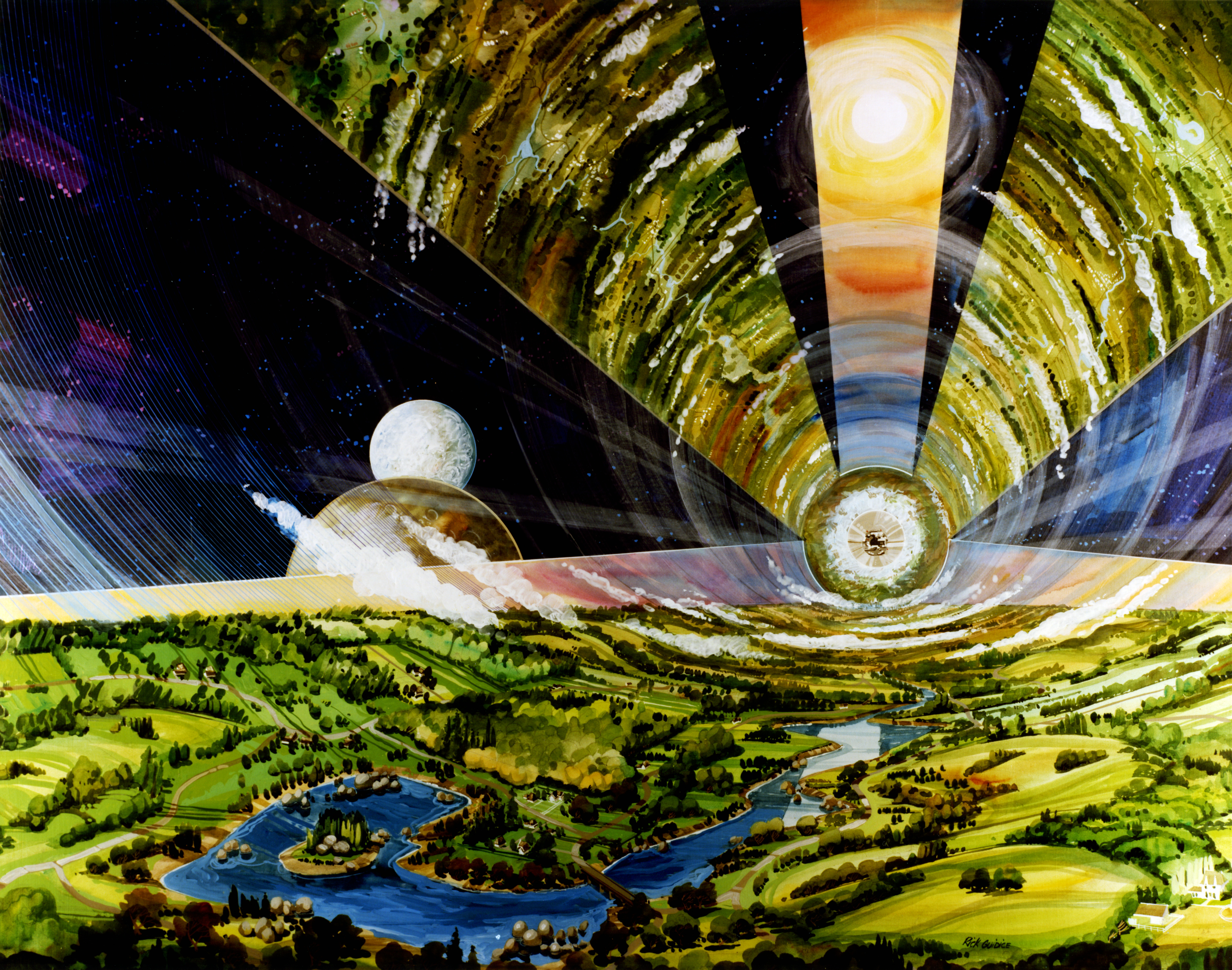
Interior view of an O'Neill cylinder space habitat, similar to a short Topopolis

A topopolis is a proposed tube-shaped space habitat, rotating to produce artificial gravity via centrifugal force on the inner surface, which is extended into a loop around the local planet or star. The concept was invented by writer Patrick Gunkel.

== Varieties of topopolises and similar fictional structures ==
A topopolis has been compared to an O'Neill cylinder, or a McKendree cylinder, that has been extended in length so that it encircles a star. A "normal" topopolis would be hundreds of millions of miles/kilometers long and at least several miles (kilometers) in diameter.

Topopoles can be looped several times around the local star, in a geometric figure known as a torus knot. Topopolises are also called cosmic spaghetti.

A topopolis with big enough diameter could theoretically have multiple levels of concentric cylinders.

Larry Niven (1974) mentioned the idea in a much-reprinted magazine article "Bigger Than Worlds".

Paul Birch referred to this design as the "macaroni habitat". He suggested that, aside from looping around a star, it could instead extend between one star and another, resulting in a habitable area about 100 million times that of the Earth.

== Examples in fiction ==
In the novel Matter, Iain M. Banks (2008) depicts a topopolis that loops its system star many times in various braidings, and houses trillions of sapient residents. The topopolis was so massive that stray gases from the system collected within the major spacing within the braids by gravitation alone, producing a slight atmosphere between the strands, that the author describes as a "haze".

Dennis E. Taylor (2020) in the book Heaven’s River features an alien civilization inhabiting a topopolis.

The setting of the worldbuilding project Orion's Arm has topopoli among the various kinds of megastructures. The system of Cableville is notable for having three topopoli of different sizes and orbits, with names referencing long objects: the innermost is Spaghetti, the one outside it is Ouroboros, and the outermost is Wyrme.

== See also ==
- Big dumb object
- Ringworld
