= Dream Park Gamemaster Pack =

Dream Park Gamemaster Pack is a 1993 role-playing supplement for Dream Park: The Roleplaying Game published by R. Talsorian Games.

== Contents ==
Dream Park Gamemaster Pack is a supplement in which a gamemaster's screen is included with a 48-page booklet as well as a nine-card sheet of characters.

== Reception ==
Steve Crow reviewed Dream Park Gamemaster Pack in White Wolf #42 (April, 1994), rating it a 3 out of 5 and stated that "The value of this pack is in the GM screen, which puts everything necessary in one place. The sample NPCs are at least useful and provide many story ideas. The rest of the material is optional and adds more complexity then you may wish to use."

== Reviews ==
- Challenge #75 (1994)
- Australian Realms #11
