= Fusion (Eclipse Comics) =

Publication information
- Publisher: Eclipse Comics
- Schedule: Monthly
- Format: Ongoing series
- Genre: Science fiction
- Publication date: January 1987 – October 1989
- No. of issues: 17
- Main character(s): Indio Tremaine; Dow Cook; Tan; Beolvoch; Alshain; Carz; Herrick; Haven; Eddie

Creative team
- Written by: Steven Barnes; Michael Reaves
- Penciller(s): Lela Dowling; Steve Gallacci
- Editor(s): Lex Nakashima

Fusion was an American comic book series published from 1987–1989 by Eclipse Comics, whose creative team included the writer Steven Barnes, the artists Lela Dowling and Steve Gallacci, conceptual editor Lex Nakashima and many more.

The world of Fusion is centuries in our future, when a series of galactic wars have led to a spiraling arms race between "tekkers and splicers" — that is, between those who take a technological and technocratic route to improving humanity, and those who have abandoned humanity altogether through genetic engineering. The story involves the exploits of a group of space mercenaries in an era when humans who have not been enhanced either genetically or cybernetically, are becoming extremely rare.

From the first issue, the book included two back up series featuring Dr. Watchstop, and the Weasel Patrol, a comic stemming from doodles "drawn" of Tan.

Weasel Patrol had an animated pilot that was produced by Nickelodeon in 1991. It was never picked up as a series.

In 2014, the first five issues were reprinted in a collection titled Fusion: The Soulstar Commission.

== Regular characters ==
The only recurring characters are the crew of the mercenary spaceship Tsunami.

- Indio Tremaine: Captain. Human. Born into the Clan of the Three Suns, of which she is the only survivor.
- Dow Cook: Synthetic human bio-engineered invulnerable to shock and trauma and with enhanced self-healing ability. Very insecure about himself.
- Tan: A musteliform bred from Terran otter stock. Canadian, an alumnus of Labatt's Tech (a fictitious university named after the beer). An alcoholic mechanical and electronics wizard with a severe gambling problem. Never goes anywhere without his leather pilot cap and goggles.
- Beolvoch: A meehook. Something like a dinosaur with feathers. Has an extremely high metabolic rate and thus a voracious appetite for raw meat. Must eat regularly and copiously to stay active. Consequently, spends much time in a suspended animation state or complaining that he is hungry. Appears to be a genuine alien species rather than uplifted and genetically engineered earthform.
- Alshain: A felinoid; a temperamental and somewhat edgy pilot.
- Carz: A leoniform with only one working eye. He is generally a steadying influence, but when he loses it, beware!
- Herrick: A hawklike creature, of military caste. Dies very early in the series, in one of many moves which went against formula. Appears in "how we got here" sequences.
- Haven: A birdlike creature with well-developed nesting instincts. She is a doctor by training.
- Eddie: Modelled after some creature with very long ears and a prehensile tail. Likes to hang upside down. A cool dude in shades and khakis or Hawaiian shirts. Nothing rattles Eddie. Was a classmate of Tan at Labatt's.
