= Flash mob =

Form of sudden public performance

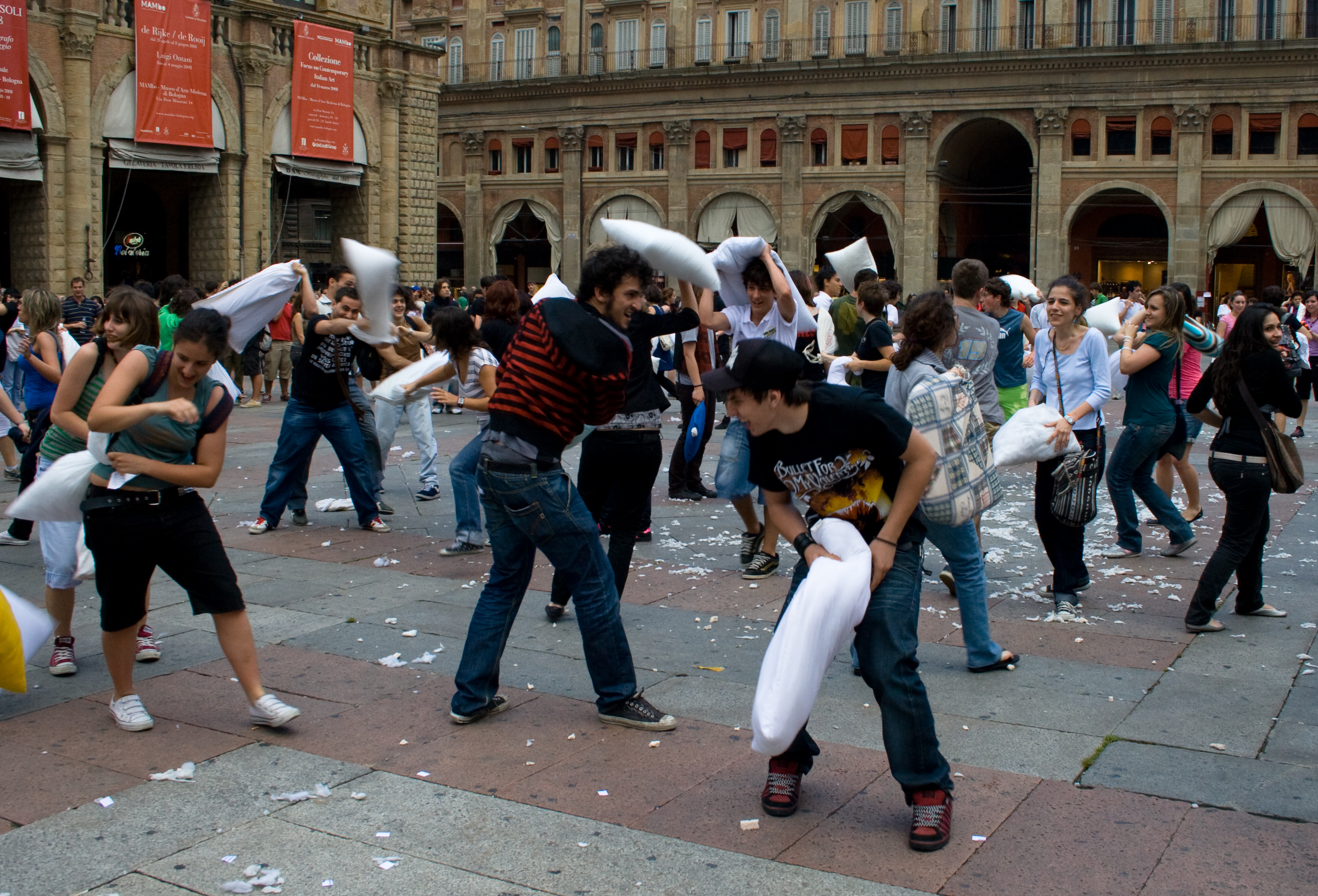
A public pillow fight in Bologna, 2008

A flash mob (or flashmob) is a group of people that assembles suddenly in a public place, performs for a brief time, then quickly disperses, often for the purposes of entertainment, satire, and/or artistic expression. Flash mobs may be organized via telecommunications, social media, or viral emails.

The term, coined in 2003, is generally not applied to events and performances organized for the purposes of politics (such as protests), commercial advertisement, publicity stunts that involve public relation firms, or paid professionals. In these cases of a planned purpose for the social activity in question, the term smart mobs is often applied instead.

The term "flash rob" or "flash mob robberies", a reference to the way flash mobs assemble, has been used to describe a number of robberies and assaults perpetrated suddenly by groups of teenage youth. Bill Wasik, originator of the first flash mobs, and a number of other commentators have questioned or objected to the usage of "flash mob" to describe criminal acts. Flash mobs have also been featured in some Hollywood movie series, such as Step Up.

== History ==
=== First flash mob ===
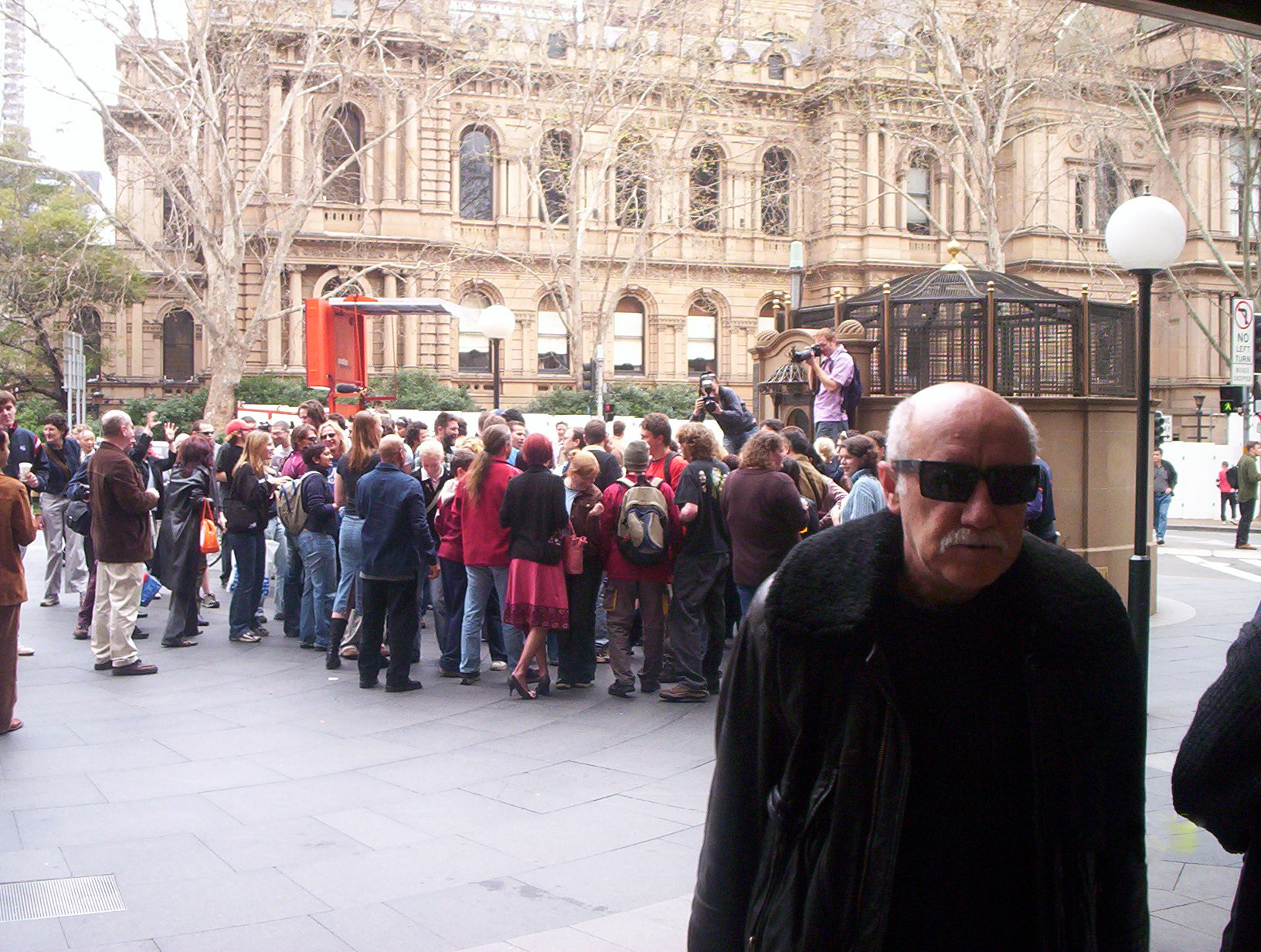
Flash mobbing was quickly imitated outside of the United States. This picture is of "sydmob" 2003, the first flash mob held in Sydney, Australia.

The first flash mobs were created in Manhattan in 2003, by Bill Wasik, senior editor of Harper's Magazine. The first attempt was unsuccessful after the targeted retail store was tipped off about the plan for people to gather. Wasik avoided such problems during the first successful flash mob, which occurred on June 17, 2003, at Macy's department store, by sending participants to preliminary staging areas—in four Manhattan bars—where they received further instructions about the ultimate event and location just before the event began.

More than 130 people converged upon the ninth-floor rug department of the store, gathering around an expensive rug. Anyone approached by a sales assistant was advised to say that the gatherers lived together in a warehouse on the outskirts of New York, that they were shopping for a "love rug", and that they made all their purchase decisions as a group. Subsequently, 200 people flooded the lobby and mezzanine of the Hyatt hotel in synchronized applause for about 15 seconds, and a shoe boutique in SoHo was invaded by participants pretending to be tourists on a bus trip.

Wasik claimed that he created flash mobs as a social experiment designed to poke fun at hippies and to highlight the cultural atmosphere of conformity and of wanting to be an insider or part of "the next big thing". The Vancouver Sun wrote, "It may have backfired on him ... [Wasik] may instead have ended up giving conformity a vehicle that allowed it to appear nonconforming." In another interview he said "the mobs started as a kind of playful social experiment meant to encourage spontaneity and big gatherings to temporarily take over commercial and public areas simply to show that they could".

=== Precedents and precursors ===
In 1973, the story "Flash Crowd" by Larry Niven described a concept similar to flash mobs. With the invention of popular and very inexpensive teleportation, an argument at a shopping mall—which happens to be covered by a news crew—quickly swells into a riot. In the story, broadcast coverage attracts the attention of other people, who use the widely available technology of the teleportation booth to swarm first that event—thus intensifying the riot—and then other events as they happen. Commenting on the social impact of such mobs, one character (articulating the police view) says, "We call them flash crowds, and we watch for them." In related short stories, they are named as a prime location for illegal activities (such as pickpocketing and looting) to take place. Lev Grossman suggests that the story title is a source of the term "flash mob".

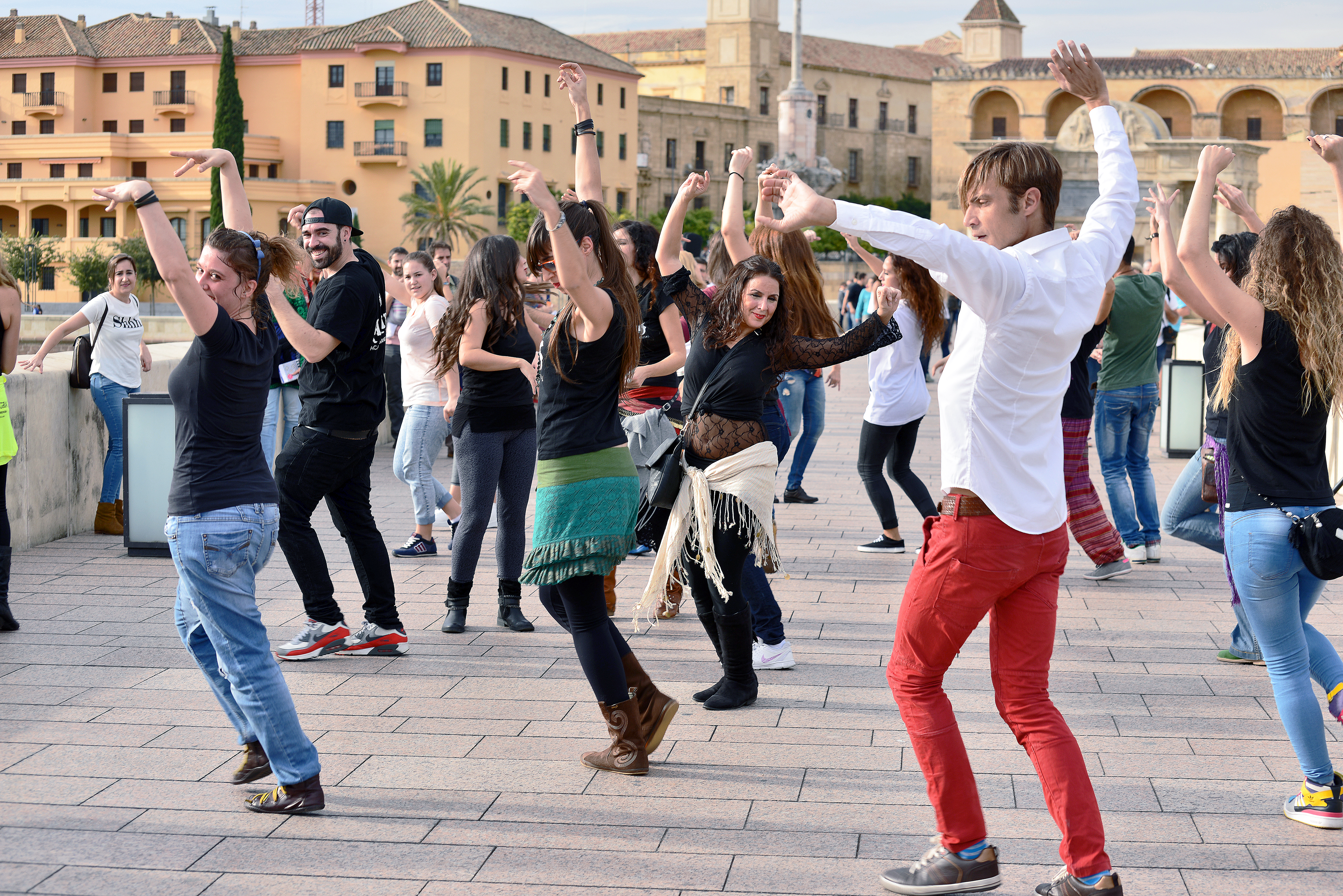
People dancing at the Eutopia 15 Flashmob Event while crossing Puerta del Puente in Córdoba, Spain (2015)

Flash mobs began as a form of performance art. While they started as an apolitical act, flash mobs may share superficial similarities to political demonstrations. In the 1960s, groups such as the Yippies used street theatre to expose the public to political issues. Flash mobs can be seen as a specialized form of smart mob, a term and concept proposed by author Howard Rheingold in his 2002 book Smart Mobs: The Next Social Revolution.

== Use of the term ==
The first documented use of the term flash mob as it is understood today was in 2003 in a blog entry posted in the aftermath of Wasik's event. The term was inspired by the earlier term smart mob.

Flash mob was added to the 11th edition of the Concise Oxford English Dictionary on July 8, 2004, where it noted it as an "unusual and pointless act" separating it from other forms of smart mobs such as types of performance, protests, and other gatherings. Also recognized noun derivatives are flash mobber and flash mobbing. Webster's New Millennium Dictionary of English defines flash mob as "a group of people who organize on the Internet and then quickly assemble in a public place, do something bizarre, and disperse." This definition is consistent with the original use of the term; however, both news media and promoters have subsequently used the term to refer to any form of smart mob, including political protests; a collaborative Internet denial of service attack; a collaborative supercomputing demonstration; and promotional appearances by pop musicians. The press has also used the term flash mob to refer to a practice in China where groups of shoppers arrange online to meet at a store in order to drive a collective bargain.

In 19th-century Tasmania, the term flash mob was used to describe a subculture consisting of female prisoners, based on the term flash language for the jargon that these women used. The 19th-century Australian term flash mob referred to a segment of society, not an event, and showed no other similarities to the modern term flash mob or the events it describes.

== Legality ==
The city of Braunschweig (Brunswick), Germany, has stopped flash mobs by strictly enforcing the already existing law of requiring a permit to use any public space for an event. In the United Kingdom, a number of flash mobs have been stopped over concerns for public health and safety. The British Transport Police have urged flash mob organizers to "refrain from holding such events at railway stations".

== Crime ==
Referred to as flash robs, flash mob robberies, or flash robberies by the media, crimes organized by teenage youth using social media rose to international notoriety beginning in 2011. The National Retail Federation does not classify these crimes as "flash mobs" but rather "multiple offender crimes" that utilize "flash mob tactics". In a report, the NRF noted, "multiple offender crimes tend to involve groups or gangs of juveniles who already know each other, which does not earn them the term 'flash mob'." Mark Leary, a professor of psychology and neuroscience at Duke University, said that most "flash mob thuggery" involves crimes of violence that are otherwise ordinary, but are perpetrated suddenly by large, organized groups of people: "What social media adds is the ability to recruit such a large group of people, that individuals who would not rob a store or riot on their own feel freer to misbehave without being identified."

It's hard for me to believe that these kids saw some YouTube video of people Christmas caroling in a food court, and said, 'Hey, we should do that, except as a robbery!' More likely, they stumbled on the simple realization (like I did back in 2003, but like lots of other people had before and have since) that one consequence of all this technology is that you can coordinate a ton of people to show up in the same place at the same time.

— Bill Wasik

These kids are taking part in what's basically a meme. They heard about it from friends, and probably saw it on YouTube, and now they're getting their chance to participate in it themselves.

— Bill Wasik

HuffPost raised the question asking if "the media was responsible for stirring things up", and added that in some cases the local authorities did not confirm the use of social media making the "use of the term flash mob questionable". Amanda Walgrove wrote that criminals involved in such activities do not refer to themselves as "flash mobs", but that this use of the term is nonetheless appropriate. Dr. Linda Kiltz drew similar parallels between flash robs and the Occupy Movement stating, "As the use of social media increases, the potential for more flash mobs that are used for political protest and for criminal purposes is likely to increase."

== See also ==
- Critical mass (sociodynamics)
- Crowd manipulation
- Happening
- Improv Everywhere
- Zap (action)
- Flash Crowd, a similar fictional concept by Larry Niven used as a plot device in several of his stories
