= The Fiendish Agents of Falkenberg =

The Fiendish Agents of Falkenberg is a 1993 role-playing adventure for Dream Park: The Roleplaying Game published by R. Talsorian Games.

== Plot summary ==
The Fiendish Agents of Falkenberg is an adventure in which the player characters oppose the forces of Baron Falkenberg.

== Reception ==
Sam Hildebrand-Chupp reviewed The Fiendish Agents of Falkenberg in White Wolf #37 (July/Aug., 1993), rating it a 1 out of 5 and stated that "To sum up, The Fiendish Agents of Falkenburg lacks depth, style and originality. It is, however, one of the only module supplements out for the game and it ought give a creative GM the opportunity to design her own, hopefully more impressive, games."

== Reviews ==
- Adventurers Club (Issue 22 - Fall 1993)
