= Bill Wasik =

American magazine editor

Bill Wasik is the editorial director of The New York Times Magazine, and self-proclaimed originator of the flash mob.

== Biography ==
Wasik grew up in Laytonsville, Maryland. He states that he was fascinated by the magazine covers like those of Newsweek as a child. Wasik graduated from Amherst College in Amherst, Massachusetts in 1996. He served as Editor of The Weekly Week, and contributed to McSweeney's. He was a senior editor both at Harper's Magazine and Wired Magazine before becoming deputy editor of The New York Times Magazine.

== Flash mob inventor ==
"For years he was 'Bill'—no last name—who cryptically told reporters he worked 'in the culture industry,'” wrote Emily Boutilier in the Winter 2015 edition of the Amherst alumni magazine. Yet in 2003, he claims, he was the originator of the first flash mob. Three years later he "revealed himself as the inventor" in an eleven-part series in Harper's, having anonymously organized the first recognized examples in New York City during the summer of 2003.

Wasik said in 2010 that he was surprised by the violence of some of the gatherings. He said the mobs started as a kind of playful social experiment meant to encourage spontaneity and big gatherings to temporarily take over commercial and public areas simply to show that they could.

“It’s terrible that these Philly mobs have turned violent,” he said.

== Works ==
Wasik is the author of 2 books, his first being And Then There's This: How Stories Live and Die in Viral Culture (Viking, 2009) and, with Monica Murphy, Rabid (Viking), which was shortlisted for the 2013 PEN/E. O. Wilson Literary Science Writing Award. His second book is Rabid: A Cultural History of the World's Most Diabolical Virus, with Monica Murphy as co-writer (Viking, 2012).

He is also the editor, with Roger D. Hodge, of Submersion Journalism: Reporting in the Radical First Person from Harper's Magazine (New Press, 2008)
