= A Hole in Space =

1974 short story/essay collection by Larry Niven

- First edition
- Author: Larry Niven
- Cover artist: Dean Ellis
- Language: English
- Publisher: Ballantine Books
- Publication date: 1974
- Publication place: United States
- Media type: Print (Hardcover)
- Pages: 196 pp
- ISBN: 0-345-24011-1
- OCLC: 874123
- Dewey Decimal: 813/.5/4
- LC Class: PZ4.N734 Ho PS3564.I9

A Hole in Space (U.K. edition ISBN 0-86007-853-1) is a collection of nine science fiction short stories and one essay, all by Larry Niven, published in 1974. This 1975 winner of the Locus Poll Award, Best Single Author Collection (place: second) includes:

- "Rammer" (this story had later become part of the novel A World Out of Time)
- "The Alibi Machine"
- "The Last Days of the Permanent Floating Riot Club"
- "A Kind of Murder"
- "All the Bridges Rusting"
- "There Is a Tide" (Note: The title is a double quotation. (1) Shakespeare, Julius Caesar, Act IV Scene iii: "There is a tide in the affairs of men/Which, taken at the flood, leads on to fortune." (2) Byron, Don Juan, Canto the Sixth: "There is a tide in the affairs of women,/Which, taken at the flood, leads – God knows where.")
- "Bigger Than Worlds" (essay)
- "$16,940.00"
- "The Hole Man"
- "The Fourth Profession"
