= The Flight of the Horse =

1973 collection of science fiction and fantasy stories by Larry Niven

- Cover of the first edition.
- Author: Larry Niven
- Cover artist: Dean Ellis
- Language: English
- Genre: Science fiction
- Publisher: Ballantine Books
- Publication date: 1973
- Publication place: United States
- Media type: Print (paperback)
- Pages: 212

The Flight of the Horse is a collection of science fiction and fantasy stories by Larry Niven, first published in paperback by Ballantine Books in September 1973. The first British edition was published by Orbit Books in June 1975. Most of the pieces were originally published between 1969 and 1972 in the magazines The Magazine of Fantasy and Science Fiction and Playboy. The others are original to the collection.

The book contains seven short stories, novelettes and novellas, five of them featuring the author's dimension-traveling protagonist Hanville Svetz, including the title story, one in his "Teleportation" series and one in his "Magic Goes Away" series, together with an afterword. The Svetz tales were later included in the collection Rainbow Mars (Tor Books, 1999).

The title story has also been adapted into a comic book version by Allan Moniz, and with artwork from Jose Delbo. It was published by Starstream #2 (1976), an anthology of science fiction comic stories.

== Contents ==
- "The Flight of the Horse" (Svetz)
- "Leviathan!" (Svetz)
- "Bird in the Hand" (Svetz)
- "There's a Wolf in My Time Machine" (Svetz)
- "Death in a Cage" (Svetz)
- "Flash Crowd" (Teleportation)
- "What Good Is a Glass Dagger?" (Magic Goes Away)
- "Afterword"
