= Beowulf's Children =

1995 novel by Larry Niven

- First edition (under original title)
- Author: Larry Niven, Jerry Pournelle and Steven Barnes
- Original title: The Dragons of Heorot
- Cover artist: Peter Mennim
- Language: English
- Genre: Science fiction
- Publisher: Gollancz (UK); Orbit Books (US)
- Publication date: 1995 (UK), 1996 (US)
- Media type: Print ()
- Pages: 447
- ISBN: 0-575-05659-2
- OCLC: 35691228
- Preceded by: The Legacy of Heorot
- Followed by: Destiny's Road

Beowulf's Children is a science fiction novel by American writers Larry Niven, Jerry Pournelle and Steven Barnes, first published in 1995. It is a sequel to The Legacy of Heorot and concerns the actions and fate of the second generation of colonists on the planet Avalon.

The book was published in the United Kingdom as The Dragons of Heorot in 1995.

== Plot summary ==
As the story opens the second generation of Avalon's colonists are coming of age, and the potential for teenage rebellion has never been so strong. The original colonists (the "Earth-born"), although selected for optimal physical and mental attributes, suffered varying levels of brain damage due to the unforeseen effects of long periods of chemically and temperature-induced hibernation necessary to survive the long journey to Avalon. Their children (the "star-born") have no such disability; instead, they are geniuses with feeble-minded parents. The Grendel Wars (in which the Earth-Born's short-sightedness nearly led to their extermination by a crocodile-like native species) are still fresh in their minds. The battle-proven (yet impaired) elders preach a dogma of zealous caution which might have once tried their own patience; the brilliant (and arrogant) Star-Born deem it cowardice and tyranny.

Adding to the strain are those who made the journey to Avalon as cargo: the "Bottle Babies", embryos grown in artificial wombs. They were raised collectively, lacking the family ties of their fellow Star-Born, and feel less obliged to obey. Aaron Tragon (perhaps the most intelligent of them) is more than just rebellious; he may be insane. As conflict brews between generations on the island of Camelot, on the mainland a dangerous question has been answered. The Grendels nearly drove the colony into extinction, but what preys on the Grendels is even worse. Two of the colony's best and brightest die in a horrifying, inexplicable fashion: a storm of yellow sand which has left nothing but naked bones soaked with Grendel supercharger, and a baby wrapped in a blue blanket. The Earth-Born ban further trips to the mainland, but the Star Born make an attempt to return on a quest for answers (and vengeance). Cadmann Weyland (the colony's hero from the Grendel War) stows away on the return trip, accidentally killing one of the Star-Born during an altercation.

The colony holds a tribunal, which finds Cadmann not guilty; this increases tension between the generations of colonists. Aaron Tragon takes advantage of this to further his own goals. Instead of challenging the decision, he shows the tribunal unshakable evidence of an approaching danger. Tau Ceti's sunspot cycle is 50 years, not 11 like Earth's. Because of it, Avalon is entering a period of agitated weather and its lifeforms will react to it in ways the colony has never before seen. If the colony is to survive, trips to the mainland to study Avalon's life are essential – trips such as the one an Earth-Born killed a Star-Born to prevent. Over the objections of senior colonists, missions to the mainland resume. Tragon has humiliated the Earth-Born and established himself as leader of the Star-Born.

Months later the yellow storm has not been seen again and the Grendels (although more numerous and varied) are only a dangerous predator, not a demonic horde. There is much to learn; the danger seems controllable until a rainstorm permits six Grendels to reach a snowy mountaintop where a study is taking place. The snow permits them to supercharge without dying, and they will not stop to eat their dead; these Grendels "cooperate". Although the team is able to drive them off with only one casualty, they are shaken. The Grendels, although dangerous, had always been predictable; now they are changing. Aaron Tragon behaves more erratically, convinced that the source of his powers is his origin as a Bottle Baby. He hopes to use artificial wombs to sire hundreds of children (breeding them like horses), and begins worshipping the Grendels.

On Camelot Cadmann is disturbed and withdrawn, reflecting on events on the mainland. A small group of Star-Born, trapped in a snowstorm, killed five Grendels with only one casualty, Stu Ellington, a bottle baby. The Grendels were intelligent enough to take advantage of the snowstorm to overcome the heat generated during supercharging, and cooperated to hunt the Star-Born. In contrast, when the Earth-Born first encountered the Grendels they lost ten colonists while driving off one gravely wounded monster. What was mortal danger to the Earth-Born is a momentary threat to the Star-Born. This reveals a further dichotomy between Earth-Born and Star-Born: to the Earth-Born the mainland is no man's land, but to the Star-Born it is an exhilarating challenge.

The killing of a Star-Born by Cadman Wayland destroyed any remaining trust of the Star-Born for the Earth-Born. The Star-Born see a parallel between the Earth-Born and the Grendels: both seem willing to kill their offspring for their benefit. This cements Aaron Tragon's role as leader of the Star-Born; to Cadmann, this appears deliberate. Aaron's quest for power causes Cadmann to investigate Aaron's background and psychology. He discovers that most "Bottle Babies" have a need for purpose, and bond strongly to their families as a result. Aaron did not bond with his family; he seems instead to have bonded to colonization at the exclusion of all other ties. He seems to be exhibiting megalomania.

On the mainland, the Grendels are evolving. Some develop the ability to resist their instinct to hunt and kill mindlessly. One, in particular, refuses to kill her own offspring; instead she establishes a family, with unknown effects on Grendel development. The Earth-Born visit the Star-Born town of Shangri-La; now that the two groups are cooperating, discoveries are made. One is disturbing: another life-form (a pollinator similar to an Earth bee) which uses a Grendel supercharger. There is also a glorious one; for the first time, a human and a Grendel meet and neither tries to kill the other.

Camelot's Grendels are an anomaly. On the mainland, some Grendels cooperate with each other and with similar species. Without the cannibalistic cycle existing on Camelot, they have more advanced traits. They hunt in packs, building bridges like beavers with "samlon ladders" to permit use by both branches of the species. One chose to leave, rather than confront an armed human. In mainland Grendels, there is the possibility for coexistence.

There is a physical difference between the two types as well. Mainland Grendels are prone to infestation by a brain parasite. Although it may be lethal (reproducing uncontrollably inside the Grendel's brain until their skull breaks open) it may also be symbiotic, enhancing the Grendels' intelligence in exchange for nutrition. This depends on when the infection occurs; during development, the symbiote and host are able to adapt to each other and produce heightened intelligence. Infestation after development is fatal, and the parasite is absent from the island.

The first discovery is also understood; the "bees" are the yellow storm. They are scavengers, with a taste for Grendels; after eating them the bees collect the supercharger like Earth bees collect pollen so when they are desperate, they can use it themselves and hunt rather than scavenge – stripping whole areas bare. This began the conflict; a windstorm pulled the sturdy, crustacean-like insects across a desert. When the storm hit the camp they were starving, and used their stores of supercharger to eat whatever was available. The blanket in which the baby was wrapped was an aposematic (warning) shade of blue (later called "Cadzie" blue for the baby it protected), which the bees avoided. This discovery gives the colonists an ability to deal with the "bees", at least on a small scale. This helps the Earth-Born realize the drawbacks of their perspective on danger, and the value of investigating (rather than avoiding) it.

The threat to the colony is not eliminated, however. Further study of the bees shows that their nests are in areas which will be flooded by the sea as the planet warms. That is why so many bees were in that storm; their hives were flooded, and soon that will happen to large bee populations. Until the storms are over the mainland will have to be evacuated, but Tragon resists. He attacks Cadmann and another Star-Born to prevent this knowledge from spreading, to protect Shangri-La and his dream. The Star-Born survives; the family-building Grendel finds him, spares his life and takes him to safety.

Tragon returns to Shangri-La with a story that Cadmann and his fellow Star-Born were eaten by Grendels, but the bees are still coming. When they arrive with devastation; not only do they eat everything but the supercharger they carry is still explosive, capable of knocking aircraft out of the sky. As Tragon rallies his people the old Grendel drags the barely alive, lost Star-Born into Shangri-La; his father welcomes both, protecting the Grendel. The boy has enough strength to say, "Aaron shot us" before the bees hit Shangri-La.

The Grendel hides in the town's cistern, and Tragon survives by burying himself in a stockyard's manure pile. The rest of the town is not as fortunate. The only things stopping the bees are solid walls or fire – which ignites hundreds at once like hundreds of cherry bombs, setting much of the town ablaze. Only 63 of about 90 colonists return to the island. Aaron Tragon is not one of them. After Shangri-La is evacuated he stumbles through the ruins of his kingdom, covered in animal waste. The crops are gone, eaten by the bees. Even the cooperative, beaver Grendels must eat the samlon (Grendel "larvae") to survive. Aaron, still driven by his ambition, wanders away from the town. Two years later, the colonists return to the ruins of Shangri-La. Tragon (or what remains of him) is there. Mentally, it seems Aaron Tragon is dead but what remains is that he has made peace with the intelligent Grendels. He will serve as a bridge between the humans and the Grendels, who will reshape Avalon into its namesake.
