= Inferno (Niven and Pournelle novel) =

1976 novel by Larry Niven

- First edition
- Author: Larry Niven; Jerry Pournelle
- Cover artist: Harry Bennett
- Language: English
- Genre: Fantasy
- Publisher: Pocket Books
- Publication date: 1976
- Publication place: United States
- Media type: Print (hardback & paperback)
- Pages: 237
- ISBN: 0-671-80490-1
- OCLC: 2328489
- Followed by: Escape from Hell

Inferno is a fantasy novel written by Larry Niven and Jerry Pournelle and published in 1976. It was nominated for the 1976 Hugo and Nebula Awards for Best Novel.

== Background ==
The book drew inspiration from the geography of Dante's Inferno and the theology of C S Lewis's The Great Divorce, which is that salvation and entry into paradise, via self-knowledge and repentance, can be achieved by all. However, most of Hell's denizens in the novel either deny their sins or feel they deserve their fate.

== Plot summary ==
Inferno is based upon the hell described in Dante's Inferno. However, it adds a modern twist to the story. The story is told in the first person by Allen Carpenter (who spelled his name "Carpentier" on his novels), an agnostic science fiction writer who died in a failed attempt to entertain his fans at a science fiction convention party. He finds himself in a Djinn-bottle in the Vestibule on the outer edge to Hell; he spends a vast amount of time there, but is released when he finally calls upon God for mercy. Allen is met by Benito, a Virgil-like figure whose full identity is not immediately apparent. Benito offers to take Allen out of Hell by bringing him to the center.

At first, as Allen and Benito travel through Hell, Allen tries to scientifically rationalize everything he sees, renaming his surroundings as 'Infernoland', a high-tech amusement park some thousand years in the future. It isn't until he sees a man recover from incineration and his own leg heal from a compound fracture that he starts to actually believe that he is in Hell. From this point on, as Allen travels through the inner circles of Hell, he sees how he is guilty of each of the sins in some fashion, commenting to himself that he is in no danger from ditch 3 of circle 8 (simony) only because he has never had any holy offices to sell. At first Allen views the punishments for these sins as far surpassing the crime, repeatedly thinking, "We're in the hands of infinite power and infinite sadism", although he comes more and more to accept the justice of the situation as he realizes that it is their continuing denial of their sins that keeps many of the condemned in hell. Eventually Allen takes over Benito's role in helping reformed souls proceed on to Paradise via Purgatory, allowing Benito to move on towards Purgatory himself. It is revealed that Benito is actually Benito Mussolini, the former dictator of Italy.

Along the way Allen meets a number of his Californian acquaintances and notable people from history (e.g. Epictetus, Billy the Kid, Jesse James, Bob Ford, L Ron Hubbard, Henry VIII, Vlad the Impaler, Aimee Semple McPherson, William M. Tweed, Al Capone) and from classical mythology (e.g. Hector, Aeneas, Charon, Minos, Phlegyas, Geryon). Due to the long time he spent bottled up in the outer vestibule he also meets some people from the future of 1976, such as a Space Shuttle pilot.

== Reception ==
The authors said that Inferno was far more successful than they predicted, and they were told that it inspired a resurgence of interest in Dante amongst college students and a new print release of John Ciardi's translation (whose quotes appear in the novel). Pournelle reported in January 1984 that he and Niven planned to write the script for a text adventure based on the novel.

== Sequel ==
The sequel to Inferno, Escape from Hell, was released in February 2009. Its working title was "Dante meets Vatican II".
