= Flash Crowd =

First publication in Three Trips in Time and Space, edited by Robert Silverberg and published by Hawthorn Books in 1973 with cover art by Ivan Seresin

"Flash Crowd" is a 1973 English-language novella by science fiction author Larry Niven, one of a series about the social consequence of inventing an instant, practically free displacement booth.

One consequence not foreseen by the builders of the system was that with the almost immediate reporting of newsworthy events, tens of thousands of people worldwide – along with criminals – would teleport to the scene of anything interesting, thus creating disorder and confusion. The plot centers around a television journalist who, after being fired for his inadvertent role in inciting a post-robbery riot in Los Angeles, seeks to independently investigate the teleportation system for the flaws in its design allowing for such spontaneous riots to occur. His investigation takes him to destinations and people around the world within the matter of less than 12 hours before he gets his chance to plead his case on television, and he encounters the wide-ranging effects of displacements upon aspects of human behavior such as settlement, crime, natural resources, agriculture, waste management and tourism.

== Characters ==
- Barry Jerome "Jerryberry" Jansen – "newstaper" (television correspondent and cameraman) for Central Broadcasting Association (CBA). Father Eric brought the family to ruin when attempting to participate in the massive investment rush for the then-burgeoning stock in displacement booths.
- George Lincoln Bailey – CBA editor
- Wash Evans – host for CBA's Tonight Show flagship news program
- Janice Wolfe – friend of Jerryberry
- Nils Kjerulf – manager of Los Angeles International, now far from the major depot of mass transit of yesteryear due to the decrease in need for air transport
- Gregory Scheffer – customs guard.
- Dr. Robin "Robbie" Whyte – inventor of the displacement booth
- Harry McCord – former Los Angeles Police Department Chief.
- Tahitian ticket-taker – formerly owned a house until squatters drove him and his family out and moved in

== Other Flash Crowd stories by Larry Niven ==
- The Alibi Machine (1973)
  - Transfer booths turned out to be a convenient alibi tool: you slip from a party for a minute, kill someone across the globe, and be back unnoticed.
- All the Bridges Rusting (1973)
- A Kind of Murder (1974)
- The Last Days of the Permanent Floating Riot Club (1974)
  - The titular Club is a gang of pickpockets who took an advantage of flash crowds. Their doom came when police figured out how to deal with flash crowd crime. Previously when police was spotted the crowd used to quickly disperse via JumpShift booths. Eventually police figured out how to reroute destinations of all booths in an area into detention nets.

== Use in other works ==
In various other books, for example Ringworld, Niven suggests that easy transportation might be disruptive to traditional behavior and open the way for new forms of parties, spontaneous congregations, or shopping trips around the world. The central character in Ringworld, celebrating his birthday, teleports across time-zones to "lengthen" his birthday multiple times (particularly notable since the first edition had the error of the character heading the wrong direction, increasing that edition's value).

Niven's essay "Exercise in Speculation: The Theory and Practice of Teleportation" was published in the collection All the Myriad Ways In it he discusses the ideas that underlie his teleportation stories.

== Other reading ==
- "Flash Crowd" is included in the short story collection The Flight of the Horse. The story (or parts of it) was originally published as "Flash Crowd" in Three Trips in Time and Space, by Robert Silverberg, ed.
- "The Last Days of the Permanent Floating Riot Club" is included in the short story collection A Hole in Space
- Other stories in this series are in these two books and in All the Myriad Ways.

== Similar references ==
On the World Wide Web, a similar phenomenon can occur, when a web site catches the attention of a large number of people, and gets an unexpected and overloading surge of traffic. This usage was first coined by John Pettitt of Beyond.com in 1996. Multiple other terms for the phenomenon exist, often coming from the name of a particular prominent, high-traffic site whose normal base of viewers can constitute a flash crowd when directed to a less famous website. Notorious examples include the "Slashdot effect", the "Instalanche" (when a smaller site gets links by the popular blog Instapundit), or a website being "Farked" or Drudged (where the target site is crashed due to the large number of hits in a short time).

== See also ==
- Flash mob
