= The Legacy of Heorot =

1987 novel by Larry Niven, Jerry Pournelle, and Steven Barnes

- First edition (UK)
- Author: Larry Niven, Jerry Pournelle and Steven Barnes
- Language: English
- Genre: Science fiction
- Publisher: Gollancz (UK); Simon & Schuster (US)
- Publication date: May 01, 1987 (UK); July 15, 1987 (US)
- Media type: Print
- Pages: 368
- ISBN: 978-0-671-64094-1
- OCLC: 15224359
- Dewey Decimal: 813/.54 19
- LC Class: PS3564.I9 L4 1987
- Followed by: Beowulf's Children

The Legacy of Heorot is a science fiction novel by American writers Larry Niven, Jerry Pournelle, and Steven Barnes, first published in 1987. Reproduction and fertility expert Dr Jack Cohen acted as a consultant on the book, designing the novel life cycle of the alien antagonists, the grendels.

This is the first book in the Heorot series. It concerns the establishment of the first human colony on Avalon, the fourth planet of Tau Ceti.

== Plot summary ==
Two hundred colonists arrive on Avalon, having made the 100-year journey from Earth in suspended animation on the starship Geographic. The colonists, selected for their outstanding physical and mental acuity, make a terrible discovery: the suspended animation has damaged their intellect and reasoning skills. Some are only mildly afflicted, while others have serious intellectual disabilities; eight cannot be reanimated at all.

The colonists build a settlement on an isolated island, and begin growing crops and stocking the nearby waters with terrestrial species to complement the samlon, a local aquatic species. The colonists become overconfident in their security, to the frustration of expedition security officer (and former soldier) Cadmann Weyland. When unsettling events begin to happen – missing animals, fences torn down – the colonists' impaired minds prevent them from properly analyzing the situation. Weyland is suspected of sabotage to further his agenda of building up defenses. He is drugged and restrained, when a monster attacks the settlement, killing ten colonists.

Resenting his treatment, Weyland retreats from the colony to an isolated homestead on a mountain near the colony. Mary Ann, a colonist with a romantic interest in Weyland, convinces him to allow her to stay with him, and conceives his child. Ultimately, Weyland agrees to assist the colony in its defenses.

The colonists are confounded by the ecology of the island, as there does not seem to be a sufficient food source for the creatures to inhabit it. An autopsy reveals that grendels (as the creatures are now known, in reference to Beowulf) are crocodilian in appearance and behavior, with powerful jaws and claws, and a sense of smell better than a dog's. Its brain shows it is at least as intelligent as a gorilla. It possesses a snorkel enabling it to lurk under several feet of water. Its cardiovascular system and musculature give it strength and stamina far beyond that of humans. A grendel can release a super-oxygenated blood supplement into its blood that does to it what nitrous oxide does to internal combustion engines – enable short bursts of speed in excess of 100 miles per hour. This trait makes the grendels devastating, but is also the key to their destruction. Using the supercharger causes the grendels to heat up so rapidly that they die if they do not immediately return to water to cool off. With this knowledge and their technology and tactics, the colonists are able to wipe out the grendel population of the island within several months, making Weyland a hero to the people who previously turned on him.

Some months later, the colony's scientists come to a disturbing realization: the grendels and the aquatic samlon are the same species. Their life cycle is similar to that of terrestrial frogs – the herbivorous samlon are in fact the juvenile form of the carnivorous grendels. The juvenile samlon are male, and become female when they mature. Interaction is unnecessary, as the grendels continually lay unfertilized eggs in the water for the samlon to fertilize. Like some species of frogs, the grendels are cannibalistic – if no other prey is present, they will eat their own young. On the colony's island, all other prey sources were previously exhausted, and the grendels have turned to cannibalism as the rule rather than the exception. The colonists have exterminated the adult grendels. But as there is now no check at all on the samlon population, they all become grendels, meaning that instead of a few dozen grendels, there are now thousands.

Weyland again asserts control. The colony's pregnant women, children and essential specialists are evacuated to the Geographic. The grendels cannot hunt far from water, so most others are evacuated to Weyland's mountain camp. Combat is joined. At first, the colonists' technology and tactics serve them well. Weyland observes the grendels' behavior and discovers that packs of grendels can be sent into a shark-like feeding frenzy by spraying them with blood taken from dead grendels, especially if it is laced with the "supercharger" chemical. Tracer bullets are used to ignite the supercharger gland in their bodies.

But as the grendels' numbers fall, their individual strength rises, as every dead grendel is food for the rest. Eventually, all that remain are the strongest and fastest fully grown grendels, and the colonists make a planned retreat to Weyland's mountain retreat. As the horde approaches, the colonists spray them with more superchargers, sending them into a frenzy once more. When they begin climbing the bluff, Weyland sets off a deadfall trap, killing even more. The grendels, though not as smart as humans, are smart enough to learn, given time and much experience. Their behavior changes as they realize the remaining colonists are not worth dying to reach when there are other grendels to kill. The colony is saved.

One year later, the grendels are being driven to extinction. Now that the grendel life cycle is known, the colonists continue the hunts, but this time the samlon are targeted as well. The new tactics, supercharger spraying and recorded grendel challenges, make them almost a routine chore. The terrestrial fish are gone, and will not be reintroduced, forcing the grendels to help drive their own species to extinction through cannibalism. Now rebuilding can begin. The battle against the grendels has left the colony with a surplus of women, and a new social organization based on polygamous marriage is taking shape. The mainland is being explored, and the colonists have high hopes. The colonists hope the story of their battle will inspire Earth's population to restart its nascent colonization program.

== Reception ==
Kirkus Reviews panned the novel as "exciting for about half, thereafter increasingly gory and tedious", with "absurdly pretentious quotes and allusions" and "too much brawn, not enough brain." However, the Los Angeles Times wrote that the novel "undertakes that presumptuous exercise [reworking the Beowulf legend in science fiction] not only without disappointment but with substantial success."

Dave Langford reviewed The Legacy of Heorot for White Dwarf #91, and stated that "Despite the resulting thrill of tens of thousands of superpowered flesh-hungry newts interminably assaulting Mr Macho's survivalist stronghold, I was tormented by the nagging thought that this would have read better at one-third the length. So it goes."

J. Michael Caparula reviewed The Legacy of Heorot in Space Gamer/Fantasy Gamer No. 85. Caparula commented that "this a life-or-death struggle for both species, and it is this double tension that makes the book stand out. Recommended".
