= The Burning City =

Fantasy novel by Larry Niven and Jerry Pournelle

- Author: Larry Niven and Jerry Pournelle
- Cover artist: Darrell Sweet
- Language: English
- Series: The Magic Goes Away
- Genre: Fantasy
- Publisher: Pocket Books
- Publication date: 2000
- Publication place: United States
- Media type: Print (hardcover)
- Pages: 486
- ISBN: 0-671-03660-2
- OCLC: 43114990
- Followed by: Burning Tower

The Burning City is a fantasy novel of social and political allegory by American writers Larry Niven and Jerry Pournelle. It is set in an analogue of Southern California in an imaginary past shortly after the sinking of Atlantis about 14,000 years ago in the twilight of a civilization then struggling and now vanished for lack of a crucial natural, and essentially non-renewable resource upon which almost all of its economy and technology depended. The vanishing resource is not oil but mana, something vital to the technology of magic and the metabolism of the supernatural. As mana becomes scarce gods sleep and finally die, unicorns get smaller and finally turn into hornless ponies, and magic becomes less and less effective and finally vanishes.

The book was published in 2000, and was followed by a sequel, Burning Tower in 2005. It is part of the same timeline as The Magic Goes Away.

== Plot summary ==
The first and last parts of the novel are set in Tep's Town, on the site of modern Los Angeles. The town consists of three classes: the Lords, the ruling class, who live in a separate area of the town; the kinless, essentially a slave class forbidden to carry weapons, descendants of a people conquered by the allied ancestors of the Lords and the Lordkin; and the Lordkin, proud, uneducated, undisciplined and indolent knife fighters organised into street gangs, who live by "gathering" whatever they wish from the kinless. The Lords supervise the kinless and placate the Lordkin. The kinless are unarmed and untrained in the use of weapons, and cannot resist the Lordkin. Some leave the town, but the surrounding vegetation is malevolent. The town is the base of a fire god, Yangin-Atep, who possesses the Lordkin every few years to burn the town down and rape any kinless woman they can catch.

The main character, Whandall, is an 11-year-old Lordkin boy severely beaten unto scarring and broken bones by Lordsmen (police) for associating with a Lord girl and illegally entering the segregated Lord's Hills. As an adult he becomes a product of his culture — a thief, a rapist, and a murderer, but, strangely, not without regret, not without honor, and not without the reader's sympathy. He teams up with an ex-Atlantis wizard and some kinless and they escape from the city. Beyond the city they find traders and Whandall founds a successful trading empire. Eventually, he returns to the city to establish a trade route there, and defeats Yangin-Atep.

In the epilogue the authors add further information to the timeline of the described reality: long after the described events, the savage people who became the "so-called Native Americans" appear on the stage and wipe out the existing civilization, including horses (and presumably cats and wheels) in their conquest of the Americas.

== Allegory ==
According to the afterword published with the book, Larry Niven originally developed the story in order to channel his feelings of frustration relating to the 1992 Los Angeles riots.

In keeping with the spirit of the allegory Niven and Pournelle drop into the text several anagrams and other oblique references that bring to mind modern people, places and events. Some examples:

- Jispomnos, anagram for O. J. Simpson: A legendary (in the story) Lordkin who married a kinless woman and adopted kinless ways. His story was made into an opera that is referenced several times in the book. As the story goes, Jispomnos killed his wife and her lover for her infidelity. On trial before a Lordkin jury Jispomnos claimed he was still a Lordkin and thus had the right to kill his cheating woman. He was, of course, acquitted. Here the authors imply their personal opinions on the O. J. Simpson affair, when they do not have Jispomnos even pretend to be innocent of the killing.
- Arshur the Magnificent, oblique reference to Rodney King: Arshur is clearly meant to sound like "Arthur", as in King Arthur so that as events unfold the reader would link King to Arshur. Arshur is a lawless bear of a man from outside the Tep's Town (a looker) who is adopted as an honorary Lordkin. In one incident Arshur is beaten severely with sticks by kinless peacekeepers when he refuses to just lie still. Lordkin anger over this "unjust beating" leads to another Burning.
- Tras Preetor, anagram for Star Reporter: A looker, an outsider who has come to Tep's Town hoping to see the Burning. Tras makes his living by telling stories and trading information, so he sees the Burning as source of exciting stories that will make him rich. The authors present Tras as a "well-intentioned fool" who nearly gets young Whandall (and himself) killed with a hare-brained scheme to curry favor with the Lords. The authors' treatment of Tras is somewhat nuanced, but they make their negative opinion of such 'lookers' fairly obvious by the end.
- Duddigract and Coscartin, anagrams for "drug addict" and "narcotics": Two minor characters, both Lordkin, who are used by the authors to make cautionary points about drug abuse; respectively, a user who dies of an overdose and a dealer who is killed for his drugs.
- Vedasiras Range, nearly an anagram for Sierra Nevada: Not long after Whandall joins up with the trader caravan, he glimpses the beast-god Behemoth in these huge mountains to the east.
- Mount Carlem, transparent anagram for Mount Carmel, near Carmel-by-the-Sea, California: A mountain near the sea north of Tep's Town. The Atlantian wizard is trapped there in the post-exodus part of the novel. The authors also add a "Carlem Marcel", the remains of a town on the bay near the mountain, drowned when the sinking of Atlantis caused world sea levels to rise.
- Others: Many other names are anagrams as well: Pothefit / top thief, Resalet / stealer, Dargramnet / grandmater, Seshmarl / harmless, Wulltid / dullwit, Tarnisos / arsonist. Forigaft is an anagram for graffito. And the name of the Toronexti betrays their main profession, which is extortion.
