= Destiny's Road =

1997 novel by Larry Niven

- First edition
- Author: Larry Niven
- Cover artist: Michael Whelan
- Language: English
- Genre: Science fiction
- Publisher: Tor Books
- Publication date: May 15, 1998
- Publication place: United States
- Media type: Print (Hardback & Paperback)
- Pages: 448
- ISBN: 978-0-8125-1106-2
- OCLC: 38933692
- Preceded by: The Secret of Black Ship Island

Destiny's Road is a science fiction novel by American writer Larry Niven, first published in 1998. It follows Jemmy Bloocher's exploration of Destiny's Road, a long scar of once-melted rock seared onto the planet's surface by a spaceship's fusion drive. Jemmy is descended from the original Destiny colonists, who were stranded when their landing craft (which created the Road) deserted them.

The novel takes place in the same universe as the novel The Legacy of Heorot.

== Back story ==
The novel is set several hundred years in the future, on an Earth-like planet named Destiny, along a length of fused bedrock known as the Road.

The Road was created to enable humans to survive on the planet, as its native life is not nutritious to Earth life—and vice versa. By sterilizing a peninsula with the ship's fusion engines and seeding the cleansed ground with Earth plant life, along with the burials of dead colonists (colloquially known as lifegivers, as they were always buried with a tree as a headstone), a self-sustaining near-analogue of Earth's ecosystem was created. At first, the colony prospered. Native viruses and bacteria are unable to infect colonists; disease is nonexistent and wounds cannot become infected, resulting in longer lifespans. Sea life quickly recovered and is consumed by the colonists as a "diet" food, as their digestive systems are unable to metabolize it into fat.

But the key word in near-analogue turned out to be near. The planet's biosphere almost completely lacks potassium. A diet lacking in potassium causes decreased intelligence in humans, which can be permanent if it is not remedied quickly—especially if this occurs during childhood. If one is denied it for too long, death always results (though in reality, potassium deficiency is more likely to result in death before intellectual disability). The reason for this lack is thus: potassium is as lethal to Destiny life as arsenic is to Earth life, and eons earlier, a form of sea life evolved the ability to concentrate potassium as a defense against predation. However, when sea life dies, its remains are deposited on the ocean floor. Ultimately, most of the element was thus leached out of the planet's ecosystem, concentrating it there. After that, volcanic activity was the only process that reintroduced potassium into the ecosystem.

Having thus discovered the lack of potassium in Destiny's biosphere, the crew of the Cavorite landing craft took the ship to search for a volcano from which to harvest potassium. However, Destiny is a far, far older planet than Earth, and is much less tectonically active: They could find only a single major volcano. But on that volcano—the future site of the Windfarm—they had an astounding stroke of luck. They found speckles, an indigenous plant that had adapted to concentrate potassium as a defense against predation, making complex extraction of the element unnecessary.

Even so, upon the ship's return to Spiral Town, they found they were too late. Everyone had succumbed to potassium deficiency: all had had severe mental retardation, and many had died. The human gene pool on Destiny had been dangerously small from the beginning—more than half of the colonists had died from hibernation-related complications during the trip to the planet—and now more had died of potassium deficiency. The colony would now inbreed itself to extinction unless drastic measures were taken.

The crew decided to use their new-found monopoly on potassium (which the novel discusses as an example of a hydraulic empire) to coerce the colonists into a new social order: they began traveling from town to town as mysterious and well-armed merchants, trading speckles for various goods and services—including sexual favors. Colonial women were impregnated by male merchants, and colonial men impregnated female merchants. By subjecting themselves to constant genetic scrutiny (to the point of charting their genealogies like horses), the merchants were thus able to eventually return the colony's gene pool to relative stability. By then the merchants had become accustomed to the new social order, or to be more precise, their position at the top of it. What had been visualized as a temporary measure then became permanent.

== Plot summary ==
At the start of the novel, the main character, Jemmy (he changes his name several times over the course of the novel) is around age 10. The novel then proceeds to skip through time in the various sections of the book including his teenage and young adult years, ending when he is in his forties. At first, he lives in his birthplace, Spiral Town, at one end of the Road—no one there knows what lies beyond a short distance down the Road.

Jemmy's adventures begin as a late adolescent when, in self-defense, he kills someone working for the merchants and is forced to flee Spiral Town. He winds up a distance down the road in a fishing community where he changes his name and appearance, and becomes a cook. He marries into the population. When a different caravan comes through town from Spiral Town, they arrange with the village elders to hire Jemmy as a chef. He proceeds on the caravan to the Neck, the isthmus which joins the peninsula to the mainland from which the caravans come. No locals, like Jemmy, are permitted on the mainland.

At the Neck, Jemmy is told he must return to his town on the next caravan—the same one he fled Spiral Town from. He instead flees by sea. Taking refuge on a boat left over from the time of Landing, he floats around the peninsula to a point beyond the Neck. There, in a storm, he goes ashore and is found by prisoners at the Windfarm—sentenced prisoners who farm speckles. All speckles come from the area and are rendered infertile by irradiation; the monopoly is rigorously maintained.

The others use clothing that Jemmy has salvaged to plot an escape, led by the violent Andrew. They break out and evade pursuit. Andrew has planned all along to kill Jemmy, but Jemmy literally gets the drop on him and kills him in self-defense. Jemmy leaves the other prisoners, taking money they have found and a supply of speckles, and flees once again.

Twenty-seven years later, Jemmy is a pit chef at a beach resort along the Road. His wife is burned in an accident and he is forced to leave his place—a place, as it turns out, of hiding. He finally reaches his lifetime's goal of seeing the other end of the Road, and Destiny Town. There, he is able to access the Cavorite's computer library and learn the true history of Destiny, a discovery which hardens him.

After his wife dies from a freak drug interaction during her burn treatment, Jemmy takes his father-in-law's widow Harlow back to the site of the prisoners' hideout, where he had planted fertile speckles. They still survive, and he takes some, sharing the secret with Harlow. They then return to the beach resort, of which Jemmy, by his wife's death, is now part owner. The two contrive to join a caravan, and Jeremy returns as a merchant's chef, unknown to his former townsfolk, to Spiral Town.

The novel concludes with Jemmy returning to his home of Spiral Town. He has traveled the length of the road distributing gumdrop candy covered in fertile speckles seeds. Where the seeds have been carelessly brushed off the candy (or surreptitiously scattered by Jemmy) speckles plants will grow. He has broken the life or death monopoly the mainland holds over the peninsula and hopefully reversed the slow decline that has gripped Spiral Town for the past 200 years.
