= Building Harlequin's Moon =

2005 novel by Larry Niven

- Author: Larry Niven and Brenda Cooper.
- Cover artist: Stephan Martinière
- Language: English
- Genre: Science fiction novel
- Publisher: Tom Doherty Associates(TOR)
- Publication date: 1 June 2005
- Publication place: United States
- Media type: Print (hardback & paperback)
- Pages: 400 (hardcover), 512p. (Paperback)
- ISBN: 0-7653-1266-2 (hardcover), ISBN 0-7653-5129-3 (paperback)
- OCLC: 57414789
- Dewey Decimal: 813/.54 22
- LC Class: PS3564.I9 B85 2005

Building Harlequin's Moon is a science fiction novel by Larry Niven and Brenda Cooper. The novel is set in the distant future as a group of space travellers, marooned in an inhospitable planetary system, attempt to terraform a moon and create a sufficient civilisation on it to refuel their ship so they can continue to their original destination.

== Plot introduction ==
A couple of centuries from the present, artificial intelligences and nanotechnology are in widespread use in the Solar System and in some cases have caused disasters. Some people do not trust these technologies and plan a simpler life in a distant planetary system, where they plan to terraform a planet called Ymir. Once Ymir is habitable, they will abandon use of all advanced technology. Three sleeper ships leave the Solar System bound for Ymir, using suspended animation to keep the crew and settlers alive during the sub light-speed journey. While in transit, all communication with the Solar System ends; by implication, human civilisation has fallen. The lead ship, John Glenn, is crippled by a design flaw en route, and uses all its antimatter fuel to reach the nearest star system, Apollo. It warns the other two ships, which can correct the flaw, but there is no word from them about whether they reach Ymir.

The John Glenn creates a substantial moon around the gas giant Harlequin by colliding several smaller moons together, and give it an atmosphere, seas, and the beginnings of an ecosystem. This takes 60,000 years, with almost all the passengers of the ship in hibernation during the entire time. The person in charge of creating and terraforming the new moon, Selene, is Gabriel.

Apart from a brief prologue, the novel begins as the second generation of people born on Selene approach adulthood.

== Plot summary ==
Gabriel is teaching a group of moon-born teenagers about agriculture. Rachel is one of these; she passes her exams and is selected by Gabriel to become a leader of the moon-born. Andrew is another; he fails his exams because he plays a practical joke on Rachel. Gabriel takes Rachel to the John Glenn. As the first moon-born to visit the ship, she arouses hostility from some of the leaders there. She learns that there are three classes amongst the space travelers: five are High Council, who rule until Ymir is reached; some dozens are Council, including Gabriel, and have extended privileges; and the remaining "Earth-born" are colonists, many of them not having been unfrozen since leaving Earth and with few rights. She also learns to use the vast repository of knowledge in the ship's library, and makes contact with the AI "Astronaut" who is kept severely restricted because the High Council doesn't trust high technology. Rachel comes to realise that when the moon-born have helped restock the ship with antimatter the John Glenn will continue on to Ymir without them, leaving them on a moon that can only sustain life for a century or two.

Gabriel decides there is no immediate need for him and Rachel to return to Selene, and that as a leader Rachel would be most useful with the longer lifespan that is conferred by the suspended animation process, and has himself and Rachel frozen for a year. Problems with radiation flares intervene, and without Gabriel to stand up for her, they are left frozen for twenty years. Rachel returns to Selene to find her best friend killed in an accident, her boyfriend married and with children almost her own age, and her remaining friends more than twice as old as she is. She also realizes that the moon-born are being treated as slaves, with Earth-born as overseers. The moon-born must develop the technological infrastructure to refine antimatter, but there are major risks involved in the refining which could destroy the population of Selene.

Rachel becomes a teacher of the next generation of moon-born. She teaches them what she is supposed to, but she also includes concepts from Earth history that she learns from the library and Astronaut - concepts such as democracy and passive resistance. She has a few friends among Council, and Astronaut is able to conceal her communications with them from other Council and High Council. Andrew (a childhood enemy) plays a more active role in stirring up rebellion, but the moon-born have no power to change their role. The Council notices the passive resistance and their members begin carrying weapons. Some years later, one of the ship's boats crash lands on Selene and is abandoned there. It has sufficient electronics to house an AI, and Rachel's Council friends make a copy of Astronaut there, Vassal, unknown to High Council.

Ten years after Rachel was unfrozen, an accident leads to a Council member shooting one of the moon-born. Andrew leads a revolt and takes a Council member hostage. The rebellion is halted by a flare which requires everyone to shelter together, and by Rachel's heroic intervention. In the wake of the rebellion, a new understanding is reached between the moon-born and the High Council. They will work more as equals, and the refinement of the antimatter will take place at a safe distance from Selene. The travellers will leave more technology behind when they leave (including the copy of Astronaut) so Selene can survive. This is at a cost of delaying their departure significantly. Gabriel decides he will remain on Selene when John Glenn departs.

A final, short, section of the novel sums up the next two hundred years, with the antimatter refined, the flare problem on Selene permanently dealt with, and John Glenn preparing for departure. Periods of suspended animation keep Rachel and Gabriel young.

There is room for a sequel, dealing with either or both of the futures of John Glenn and Ymir, and of Selene.

== Characters in "Building Harlequin's Moon" ==
- Gabriel – the Earth-born man responsible for the terraforming of the moon, and teacher of the moon-born
- Rachel – a moon-born woman and protégé of Gabriel
- Astronaut – an Artificial Intelligence
