= The Descent of Anansi =

1982 novel by Larry Niven and Steven Barnes

- First edition (publ. Tor Books); Cover art by Howard Chaykin
- Author: Steven Barnes, Larry Niven
- Language: English
- Publication date: 1982

The Descent of Anansi is a 1982 science fiction novel by American writers Steven Barnes and Larry Niven.

== Plot summary ==
A space station manufactory attempts to become commercially independent from its government backers by exporting super-strong nanowire that can only be manufactured in free-fall.

Following an attempt to sabotage their first delivery and hijack the cargo, the intrepid crew realizes they can escape the hijackers. Their shuttle Anansi can become a modern-day version of its namesake, an African spider-god, by descending to Earth on a thread.

The physics of tidal forces are explained, and the possibilities of orbital tethers to accelerate payloads into higher orbits (or indeed de-orbit shuttles without retro-rockets) are woven into a hard science fiction thriller.

== Reception ==
Dave Langford reviewed The Descent of Anansi for White Dwarf #54, and called it "Fast-moving, predictable, inoffensive."
