= Escape from Hell (novel) =

2009 novel by Larry Niven and Jerry Pournelle

- Author: Larry Niven, Jerry Pournelle
- Cover artist: Stephan Martiniere
- Language: English
- Genre: Fantasy
- Publisher: Tor Books
- Publication date: 2009
- Publication place: United States
- Media type: Print
- Pages: 336 (hardcover)
- ISBN: 978-0-7653-1632-5
- OCLC: 245537163
- Dewey Decimal: 813/.54 22
- LC Class: PS3564.I9 E83 2009
- Preceded by: Inferno

Escape from Hell is a fantasy novel by American writers Larry Niven and Jerry Pournelle. It is a sequel to Inferno, the 1976 book by the same authors. It was released on February 17, 2009.

The novel continues the story of deceased science fiction writer Allen Carpenter (who spelled his name "Carpentier" on his novels) in his quest to help other damned souls in Hell. Like the first book, “Escape from Hell” extensively references Dante's Inferno. Jerry Pournelle, one of the book's co-authors, described the book as "Dante meets Vatican II."

== Plot ==
Following events in the first novel, in which Carpenter learned that it is possible to leave Hell, Carpenter wants to help others in the way his benefactor helped him. Carpenter meets and travels through all the circles of the Hell described by Dante. He is accompanied in his travels by Sylvia Plath (whom he rescues from the Wood of the Suicides by burning her tree, causing her physical body to reform itself), attempting to understand the purpose of Hell and free many of the damned. Carpenter discovers that, apparently because he returned to Hell of his own free will to help others, he now possesses powers and abilities such as his mentor, Benito, also displayed.

In his travels, Carpenter meets many well-known individuals deceased as of 2009. In addition to Plath, some of the notables encountered by Carpenter include:

- Lester del Rey
- Anna Nicole Smith
- Else Frenkel-Brunswik
- George Lincoln Rockwell
- Ted Hughes
- Charles Francis Adams, Sr.
- Albert Camus
- Carl Sagan
- Seung-Hui Cho
- Kenneth Lay
- Aimee Semple McPherson
- Peter Lawford
- J. Edgar Hoover
- Melvin Belli
- Reinhard Heydrich
- Frederick Lindemann, 1st Viscount Cherwell
- Sir Arthur Harris, 1st Baronet
- Jesse M. Unruh
- Leon Trotsky
- Pontius Pilate
- J. Robert Oppenheimer
- Frank Harris

In the end, and partly as the consequence of some unusual changes to Hell itself, Carpenter not so much escapes as that he is shown the door for being a troublemaker.

== Critical reception ==
Published reviews were mixed. At the SF Site, Ivy Reisner found it "thoughtful", noting that it "runs far closer in tone to [Dante's] original" than does the 1976 book, and observing that it is a "charged political work" in which "not all of the condemnations will appeal to all of the readers" (in particular citing a teenage boy who was damned for sodomy because he had been raped by a priest). Publishers Weekly called it a "well-constructed tale" — albeit one whose "landscape and (...) plot are a little too familiar." James Nicoll described it as "an unnecessary sequel" which demonstrates "that a sequel to a successful book may not be very good".
