= Burning Tower =

2005 fantasy novel by Larry Niven and Jerry Pournelle

- Author: Larry Niven and Jerry Pournelle
- Cover artist: Paul Youll
- Language: English
- Series: The Magic Goes Away
- Genre: Fantasy
- Publisher: Pocket Books
- Publication date: February 1, 2005
- Publication place: United States
- Media type: Print (hardcover)
- Pages: 448
- ISBN: 0-7434-1691-0
- OCLC: 56108129
- Dewey Decimal: 813/.54 22
- LC Class: PS3564.I9 B873 2005
- Preceded by: The Burning City
- Followed by: Burning Mountain

Burning Tower is a fantasy novel by American writers Larry Niven and Jerry Pournelle. It is a sequel to The Burning City, set some years after that novel concluded. It was published in 2005.

== Plot summary ==
The three main characters are Sandry, a Lord of Tep's Town, Sandry's cousin Regapisk, also a Lord, and Burning Tower, a daughter of Whandall, the main character of the previous book. Regapisk is an incompetent Lord and his family arrange for him to be shanghaied to become an oarsman on a coastal ship. Sandry and Burning Tower are romantically linked throughout the book.

Large flightless birds attack trading caravans, but Sandry fights them off. He is sent by the Lords with the caravan, of which Burning Tower is also a part, to discover the source of the birds. They travel to the southern city of Condigeo and then to Crescent City, defeating terror bird attacks along the way. In Crescent City, they are joined by Regapisk, who has escaped from his ship. The three of them travel on to the high-magic city of Aztlan, where Regapisk redeems himself.

The authors researched Aztec culture for the book, and many aspects of the culture depicted in the book are based on that research. This is explained in a brief note at the end of the book. Also mentioned is that within the described timeline, the terror birds continued to exist until long after humans spread through the Americas; this is based on the North American phorusrhacid Titanis walleri (but see McFadden et al. 2007).

== Sources ==
- McFadden, Bruce; Labs-Hochstein, Joann; Hulbert, Richard C. Jr. & Baskin, Jon A. (2007): Revised age of the late Neogene terror bird (Titanis) in North America during the Great American Interchange. Geology 35(2): 123–126. doi:10.1130/G23186A.1 PDF fulltext
