= Brenda Cooper =

American writer

- Cooper at the World Fantasy Convention 2026
- Born: August 12, 1960 (age 66); Encino, California
- Occupations: Novelist, short-story writer, futurist
- Writing career
- Period: Early 21st century
- Genres: Science fiction, fantasy
- Subjects: Science, history, nature, society
- Website: brenda-cooper.com

Brenda Cooper (born August 12, 1960) is an author and futurist who resides in Kirkland, Washington, where she is the Chief Information Officer of the city of Kirkland. She has co-written various short stories with Larry Niven and has written ten novels.

Brenda was educated at California State University, Fullerton, where she earned a BA in Management Information Systems. She is also pursuing an MFA at StoneCoast, a program of the University of Southern Maine.

Brenda lives in Woodinville, Washington with her family and three dogs.

== Bibliography ==
=== Novels ===
- Building Harlequin's Moon, (2005) written with Larry Niven.
- Mayan December. Vol. e–book. Prime Books. 2011. ISBN 978-1-60701-307-5.
- POST. eSpec. 2017. ISBN 978-1942990222.

Silver Ship series

1. The Silver Ship and the Sea. Tor Science Fiction. July 1, 2008. ISBN 978-0-7653-5509-6.
2. Reading the Wind (1st ed.). Tor Books. July 22, 2008. ISBN 978-0-7653-1598-4.
3. Wings of Creation. Vol. 1st Edition. Tor Books. November 10, 2009. ISBN 978-0-7653-2095-7.
4. The Making War Wordfire Press. Oct 07, 2020. ISBN 9781680571103

Ruby's Song

1. The Creative Fire. Vol. 1st Edition. Pyr. November 6, 2012. ISBN 978-1616146849.
2. The Diamond Deep (2013)

The Glittering Edge (sequels to Ruby's Song)

1. Edge of dark. Pyr. 2015.
2. Spear of Light. Vol. 1st Edition. Pyr. 2016. ISBN 978-1633881341.

=== Short fiction ===
Stories

Title	Year	First published	Reprinted/collected	Notes
The Robot's Girl	2010	Cooper, Brenda (April 2010). "The Robot's Girl". Analog Science Fiction and Fact. 130 (4).		

- "Paper of Elephants". Clarkesworld Magazine. October 2021.
- "Callme and Mink". Clarkesworld Magazine. October 2020.
- Brin, David, ed. (January 10, 2017). "Street Life in the Emerald City". Chasing Shadows. Tor Books. pp. 196–207. ISBN 978-0765382580.
- McPhail, Mike, ed. (December 18, 2016). "Along the Northern Border". Defending the Future. eSpec Books. ASIN B01MU2H4BC.
- Schvartsman, Alex, ed. (November 24, 2016). "The Hand on the Cradle". Humanity 2.0. Phoenix Pick. ISBN 978-1612423098.
- Schmidt, Brian Thomas, ed. (November 3, 2015). "Iron Pegasus". Mission Tomorrow. Baen. ISBN 978-1476780948.
- "Star of Humanity". Cracking the Sky. Fairwood Press. April 22, 2015. ISBN 978-1933846507.
- "Entropy and Emergence". Cracking the Sky. Fairwood Press. April 22, 2015. ISBN 978-1933846507.
- Cooper, Brenda (May 2010). Henry Gee (ed.). "Mind Expeditions". Nature. 465 (7296): 390. Bibcode:2010Natur.465..390C. doi:10.1038/465390a. S2CID 4399169.
- Cooper, Brenda (December 2011). "Tea with Jillian". Nature. 480 (7378): 578. Bibcode:2011Natur.480..578C. doi:10.1038/480578a. S2CID 4428578.
- "Star of Humanity". Fairwood Press. August 2015.
- Sheila Williams, ed. (September 2015). "Biology at the End of the World". Asimov's Science Fiction.
- "My Father's Singularity". Clarkesworld Magazine. June 2010.
- "The War of the Flowers". Strange Horizons. January 2004.

=== Poetry ===
- "Visitors". 2016.
- "Extinction". 2016.
- "The Multiple Universe Poems". September 2009.
- "Raising Horses in the Rain". Spring 2001.

=== Critical studies and reviews of Cooper's work ===
Edge of dark

- Sakers, Don (June 2015). "The Reference Library". Analog Science Fiction and Fact. 135 (6): 105–108.

== Awards ==
Endeavor Award

- The Silver Ship and the Sea (Distinguished Novel or Collection, 2008)
- Edge of Dark (Distinguished Novel or Collection, 2016)
