= The Magic Goes Away =

1976 novella and series by Larry Niven

- Short story by Larry Niven
- Cover for the illustrated edition, art by Boris Vallejo.
- Country: United States
- Language: English
- Genre: Fantasy

Publication
- Publication date: 1976

The Magic Goes Away is a fantasy novella written by Larry Niven in 1976 and published in book form in 1978 with illustrations by Esteban Maroto. The name is also used to refer to the series which includes this story. Written after the 1973 oil crisis, the series is an allegory for the modern-day energy crisis.

== List of works in the series ==
Title	Sub-series	Published	Original publication
"Not Long Before the End"	Warlock	1969	Fantasy and Science Fiction, April 1969
"Unfinished Story"	Warlock	1970	Fantasy and Science Fiction, December 1970
"What Good Is a Glass Dagger?"	Warlock	1972	Fantasy and Science Fiction, September 1972
The Magic Goes Away (novella)	Warlock	1976 / 1978	Odyssey, Summer 1976 / Trade paperback, Ace Books
The Magic May Return (multi-author anthology)	(none)	1981	Trade paperback, Ace Books
"Talisman" (with Dian Girard)	(none)	1981	Fantasy and Science Fiction, November 1981
"The Lion in His Attic"	(none)	1982	Fantasy and Science Fiction, July 1982
More Magic (multi-author anthology)	(none)	1984	Trade paperback, Ace Books
"The Wishing Game"	Warlock	1989	Aboriginal Science Fiction, May/June 1989
"The Portrait of Daryanree the King"	(none)	1989	Aboriginal Science Fiction, September/October 1989
The Burning City	Golden Road	2000	Hardcover, Pocket Books
"Chicxulub"	(none)	2004	Asimov's Science Fiction, April/May 2004
"Boomerang"	(none)	2004	Flights: Extreme Visions of Fantasy
"Rhinemaidens"	(none)	2005	Asimov's Science Fiction, January 2005
Burning Tower	Golden Road	2005	Hardcover, Pocket Books
The Seascape Tattoo	(none)	2016	Hardcover, Tor Books

== Background ==
In "Not Long Before the End", the Warlock, a very powerful sorcerer at least 200 years old, observes that when he stays in one place too long, his powers dwindle, and they return only when he leaves that place. Experimentation leads him to create an apparatus consisting of a metal disc enchanted to spin perpetually. The enchantment eventually consumes all of the mana in the vicinity, which causes a localized failure in all magic. The Warlock realizes that magic is fueled by a non-renewable resource, which would cause great concern among the magicians.

In The Magic Goes Away, the widespread diminishing of magical power triggers a quest on the part of the most powerful of the magicians of the time to harness a new source of magic, the Moon.

In The Magic May Return, it is discovered that mana was originally carried to Earth and the other bodies of the Solar System on the solar wind, which replenishes mana slowly over time. At some point, a god created an invisible shield between Earth and Sun that intercepted the solar mana and caused the eventual decline of magic on Earth.

== Reception ==
Richard A. Lupoff reviewed the 1978 novella unfavorably, saying that although the story "bristles with amusing devices", the writing itself was unsatisfactory; he felt that there was not a spark of humanity in the book, and that the writer used "flat", "dull", "sterile" narrative prose.

== Influences ==
In her afterword to the novella, Sandra Miesel identified a number of influences on the setting: "The Wheels of If", The Incomplete Enchanter, The Blue Star, Operation Chaos, Too Many Magicians, The Dragon and the George, as well as Niven's earlier works "All the Myriad Ways" and the Svetz series.

There are also several references to the works of H. P. Lovecraft, such as the reference of a mad magician named Alhazred and an amorphous god called the Crawling Chaos.

== Graphic novel adaptation ==
The Magic Goes Away was adapted by Paul Kupperberg and Jan Duursema as a graphic novel in 1986, as the sixth in the DC Science Fiction Graphic Novel series.

== In popular culture ==
These card games use a card called "Nevinyrral" ("Larry Niven" spelled backwards), which reference elements from The Magic Goes Away:

- The collectible card game Magic: The Gathering (by Richard Garfield) has a card called "Nevinyrral's Disk", which is a reference to the Warlock's spinning metal disk. This card roughly has the effect of removing the effects of players' spells from play, while leaving their lands intact.
- The collectible card game Netrunner (also by Richard Garfield) has a card called "Nevinyrral" which has the effect of giving the Corporate player an extra action each turn, but if this card goes away the Corporate player loses.
