= Steven Barnes =

American writer (born 1952)

- Born: March 1, 1952 (age 74); Los Angeles, California, U.S.
- Education: Los Angeles High School; Pepperdine University
- Occupation: Writer
- Spouse: Tananarive Due
- Children: 2

Steven Barnes (born March 1, 1952) is an American science fiction, fantasy, and mystery writer. He has written novels, short fiction, screenplays for television, scripts for comic books, animation, newspaper copy, and magazine articles.

== Early life and education ==
Barnes, was born on March 1, 1952, in Los Angeles, California. He has had a varied education, including a secondary education at Los Angeles High School. He continued at Pepperdine University, majoring in communication arts.

== Career ==
Barnes wrote several episodes of The Outer Limits and Baywatch. His "A Stitch In Time" episode of The Outer Limits won an Emmy Award. He also wrote the episode "Brief Candle" for Stargate SG-1 and the Andromeda episode "The Sum of Its Parts". Barnes's first published piece of fiction, the 1979 novelette "The Locusts", was written with Larry Niven, and was a Hugo Award nominee. Barnes subsequently collaborated with Niven on several other books, including three books with both Niven and Jerry Pournelle. Barnes said he clashed politically with the two conservative writers but enjoyed working with them, calling it "a tremendous learning opportunity".

Barnes's alternate history novel Lion's Blood won the 2003 Endeavour Award. His 2004 Star Wars tie-in novel The Cestus Deception was a New York Times bestseller.

Together with his wife, Tananarive Due, and actor Blair Underwood, Barnes won the 2009 NAACP Image Award for outstanding Literary Work - Fiction for In the Night of the Heat: A Tennyson Hardwick Novel.

== Personal life ==
Barnes is married to Tananarive Due, a writer. The couple live in Los Angeles and host a video blog together. They also taught a course together at UCLA called "The Sunken Place: Racism, Survival & Black Horror" that experienced a surprise visit from Get Out director Jordan Peele. The course is now available as a webinar. Barnes has a daughter from his first marriage and a son from his current marriage.

Barnes is also an avid practitioner of martial and physical arts. He began studying in 1969. He is a black belt in Kenpo Karate (BKF style), and Kodokan Judo. He holds an instructor certificate in Wu Ming Ta, and has an instructor candidate ranking in Filipino Kali stick and knife fighting. He is an advanced student in Jun Fan kickboxing (Bruce Lee method under Dan Inosanto), and is an instructor in Wu-style tai chi under Hawkins Cheung.

He is an intermediate student in self-defense pistol shooting (preferring the Turnipseed modified Weaver method). He holds a brown belt in Shorenji Jiu Jitsu, and intermediate rankings in Tae Kwon Do and Aikido. He completed the Yoga Works basic Hatha Yoga instructor program; and is studying Pentjak Silat (an Indonesian fighting system) with Guru Stevan Plinck, and Ashtanga Yoga, an aerobic form of yoga.

== Bibliography ==
- The Dream Park series:
  - Dream Park (1981; with Larry Niven)
  - The Barsoom Project (1989; with Larry Niven)
  - The California Voodoo Game (1992; with Larry Niven)
  - The Moon Maze Game (2011; with Larry Niven)
- The Aubry Knight series:
  - Street Lethal (1983)
  - Gorgon Child (1989)
  - Firedance (1993)
- The Heorot series:
  - The Legacy of Heorot (1987; with Larry Niven and Jerry Pournelle)
  - The Dragons of Heorot (1995; with Larry Niven and Jerry Pournelle)
  - Beowulf's Children (1995; with Larry Niven and Jerry Pournelle)
  - Starborn and Godsons (2020; with Larry Niven and Jerry Pournelle)
- The Insh'Allah series:
  - Lion's Blood (2002; winner of the 2003 Endeavour Award)
  - Zulu Heart (2003)
- The "Ibandi" series:
  - Great Sky Woman (2006)
  - Shadow Valley (2009)
- The Tennyson Hardwick Novels:
  - Casanegra (2007; with Blair Underwood and Tananarive Due)
  - In the Night of the Heat (2008; with Blair Underwood and Tananarive Due)
  - From Cape Town with Love (2010; with Blair Underwood and Tananarive Due)
  - South by Southeast (September 2012; with Blair Underwood and Tananarive Due)
- Stand-alone novels, screenplays, and other works:
  - The Descent of Anansi (1982; with Larry Niven)
  - "To See the Invisible Man" (1986; a television script adapting a short story by Robert Silverberg, for the 1980s revival of The Twilight Zone)
  - The Kundalini Equation (1986)
  - Fusion (1987) (issues #1–5 only)
  - Achilles' Choice (1991) (with Larry Niven)
  - Blood Brothers (1996)
  - Iron Shadows (1997)
  - Far Beyond the Stars (1998) (Star Trek: Deep Space Nine novelization)
  - The Lives of Dax: "The Music Between the Notes" (1999)
  - Saturn's Race (2000) (with Larry Niven)
  - Charisma (2002)
  - The Cestus Deception (2004) (Star Wars novel set in the Clone Wars)
  - Assassin and Other Stories (2010), a collection, ISFiC Press
  - The Invisible Imam, a novel included in Assassin and Other Stories (2010)
  - Devil's Wake (2012; with Tananarive Due)
  - Domino Falls (2013; with Tananarive Due)
  - Star Wars Saved My Life: Be the HERO in the adventure of your lifetime! (2015), illustrated by Trey Jackson and Angelina Greenwood
  - The Seascape Tattoo (2016; with Larry Niven)
  - Twelve Days (2017)
  - Star Wars: Mace Windu: The Glass Abyss (2024) (Star Wars novel set shortly after The Phantom Menace)
- Short stories
  - "The Woman in the Wall" (2000; novelette)
  - "Danikil", Whose Future Is It? (2018)
