= Francisco de Ávila =

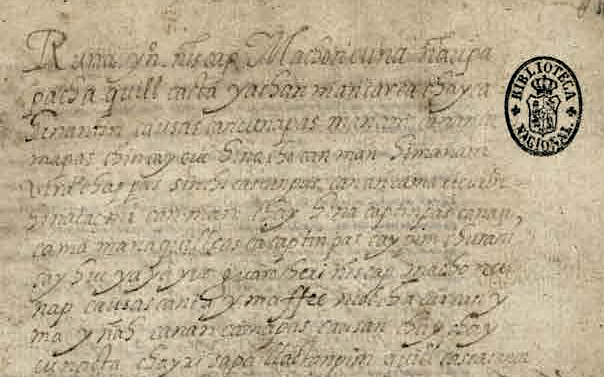
Excerpt from the manuscript "Dioses y hombres de Huarochiri (Gods and Men of Huarochirí)", compiled by Francisco de Ávila.

Francisco de Ávila (c. 1573 – 1647) was a Peruvian presbyter, theologian, and canon doctor. He is a highly controversial figure in Spanish colonial history, serving as a pioneer and judge in the institutionalized "extirpation of idolatries" (extirpador de idolatrías) campaigns within the Viceroyalty of Peru.

To modern history, anthropology, and linguistics, Ávila is important for having commissioned and compiled the documents known as the Huarochirí Manuscript (c. 1608). Written in a sophisticated, early colonial Quechua, this text is universally considered the most important source for understanding Inca mythology, indigenous religion, and Andean traditions in the central highlands of Peru.

== Biography ==
=== Early life and mysterious origins ===
Ávila was born in Cusco around 1573. He was an expósito (an abandoned child), found on the doorstep of a Spanish couple, Cristóbal Rodríguez and María de Ávila, who adopted and raised him. While some early colonial accounts labeled him a criollo, modern historiography strongly suggests he was of mestizo or indigenous biological background. This ethnic origin would explain his absolute, native fluency in the Quechua language, a skill that later defined his ecclesiastical career.

He studied at the prestigious Jesuit College of San Martín in Lima and later attended the National University of San Marcos, where he earned a doctorate in Theology and Canon Law. He was ordained as a secular priest and quickly gained a reputation for his brilliant intellect and deep understanding of indigenous mentalities.

=== The Parish of Huarochirí and the Native Revolt (1607) ===
In 1597, Ávila was appointed as the parish priest (doctrinero) of the rural province of Huarochirí, in the highlands of Lima. His primary mandate was the conversion of the local populations to Catholicism. However, Ávila used his position to establish an aggressive system of economic exploitation against his indigenous parishioners, accumulating a vast personal fortune through forced labor, illegal taxes, and unauthorized commercial monopolies.

By 1607, the abuses grew intolerable. Led by their local native lords (curacas), the indigenous communities organized a legal and political revolt. They formally accused Ávila before the Archiatric Court of Lima for severe corruption, extortion, and systemic violence. Ávila was subsequently arrested, stripped of his administrative duties, and jailed in Lima pending trial.

=== The Counter-Strategy: Creating the Extirpation of Idolatries ===
Faced with certain imprisonment and economic ruin, Ávila designed a highly effective legal defense. He claimed before the Archbishop of Lima, Bartolomé Lobo Guerrero, that the indigenous accusations were a coordinated conspiracy. Ávila argued that the true reason the natives hated him was not because of financial corruption, but because his zealous Christian preaching threatened their secret, ongoing worship of ancestral deities (huacas).

The ecclesiastical authorities accepted his argument and acquitted him. Released from prison and invested with new, inquisitorial judicial powers, Ávila returned to Huarochirí in 1608 as a judge-extirpator. To validate his defense, he launched a massive campaign of religious repression. He systematically destroyed thousands of sacred indigenous objects, ordered the public flogging of native priests, and exhumed and burned ancestral mummies.

In a spectacular auto-da-fé held in Lima's main square in 1609, Ávila publicly humiliated the native leadership and burned the sacred remains of the local goddess Chaupi Ñamca. His personal crusade was so successful that the Spanish Crown adopted it as official policy, inaugurating the formal "Campaigns for the Extirpation of Idolatry" across the entire Viceroyalty.

=== Later ecclesiastical success ===
Following his campaigns, Ávila was heavily rewarded. He was appointed as a canon (canónigo) of the Cathedral of La Plata (modern Sucre, Bolivia) and later returned to Lima to serve as a high dignitary in the Metropolitan Cathedral. He died in Lima in 1647, leaving behind an influential theological legacy justifying the destruction of native religions, alongside a massive personal estate.

== The Huarochirí Manuscript ==
Paradoxically, Ávila's most enduring legacy is the documentation of the very culture he spent his life trying to eradicate. Around 1608, in order to identify and effectively destroy hidden pagan beliefs, Ávila ordered a group of literate, indigenous assistants to record the oral histories, myths, and ancestral traditions of the Huarochirí province in their native tongue.

The primary scribe behind this project was a native nobleman named Don Cristóbal Choque Casa. The resulting collection of 31 chapters, known today as the Huarochirí Manuscript, offers an unparalleled insider view into the Andean worldview, including:

- The mythological warfare between the regional creator deities Pariacaca and Huallallo Carhuincho.
- Pre-Inca and Inca accounts of creation and localized global deluges.
- Detailed accounts of indigenous astronomy, such as the cosmic river (Mayu) and dark cloud constellations like the Yakana.

=== Rediscovery and Academic Impact ===
The manuscript was never published during Ávila's lifetime and remained forgotten in the archives of the National Library of Madrid until the 20th century. Its rediscovery transformed Andean studies:

- It was first translated into German by the ethnologist Hermann Trimborn.
- In 1966, the acclaimed Peruvian indigenist writer and anthropologist José María Arguedas translated the text into Spanish under the title Dioses y hombres de Huarochirí. Arguedas famously dubbed the document the "Andean Bible" due to its foundational literary and spiritual weight.
- Modern scholarship analyzes the text not as Ávila's creation, but as a critical monument of early colonial indigenous literature and Quechua philology.

== See also ==
- Huarochirí Manuscript
- Andean dark constellations
- Inca astronomy
- Mestizo
