= Yakana =

Inca mythology

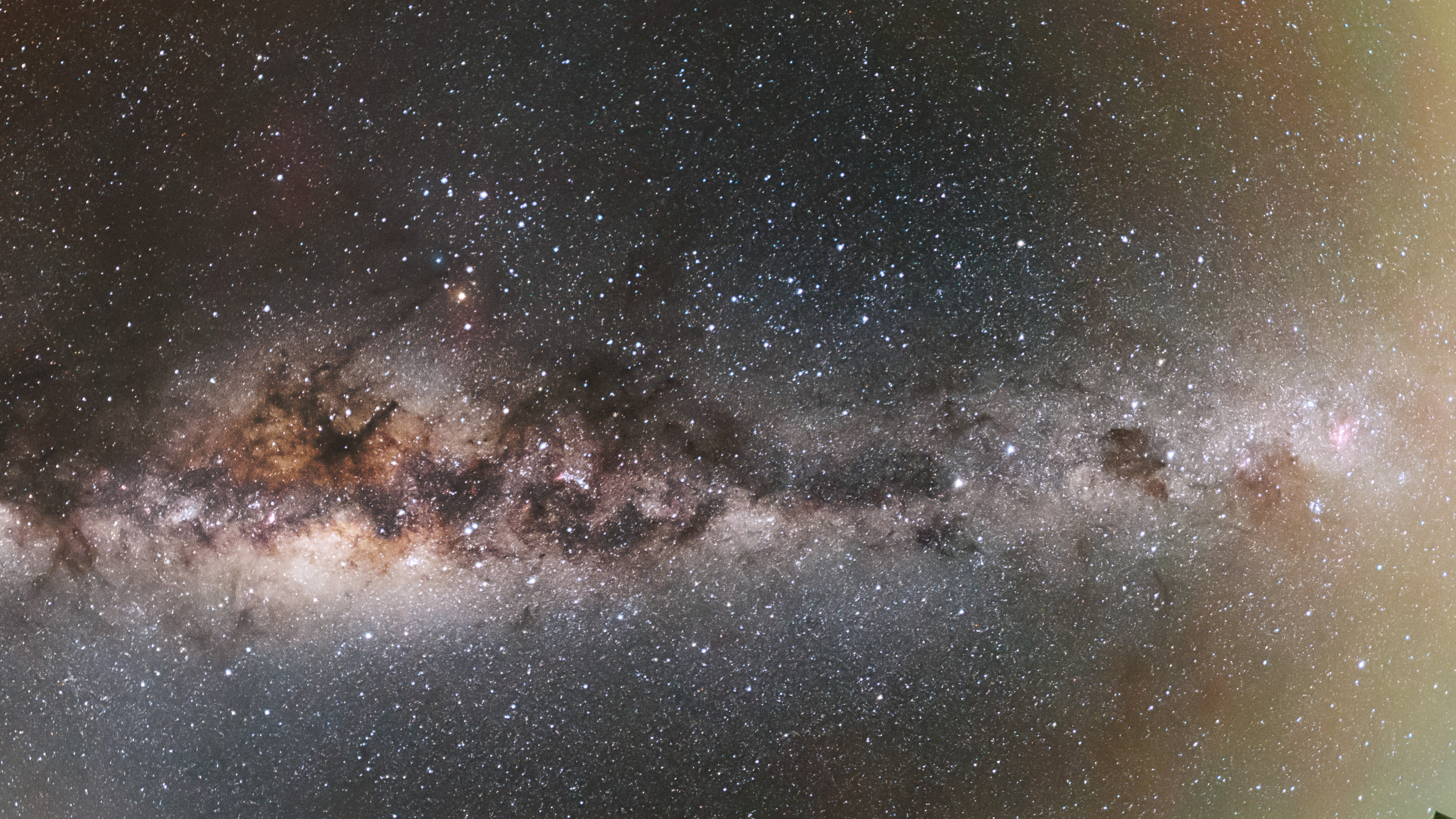
The dark nebula constellation of the Yakana (the Celestial Llama) located within the Milky Way, with the bright stars Alpha and Beta Centauri representing its eyes (Ñawicuna).

In Inca mythology, the Yakana (also known as Qatachillay) is the central and largest Andean dark constellation (Quechua: lit. 'black cloud'). Rather than being formed by a cluster of stars, it is a silhouette carved out of the molecular clouds and interstellar dust lanes of the Milky Way (known in Quechua as the Mayu, or Celestial River). Historically, the Yakana represents the cosmic essence and protective spirit (camac) of terrestrial llamas and camelid herds.

== Mythological description ==
According to Chapter 29 of the Huarochirí Manuscript, a fundamental 16th-century Quechua codex compiled by the priest Francisco de Ávila, the Yakana is described as a living creature walking through the center of the celestial river. The myth states that the Yakana animates and gives life-force to earthly llamas, appearing with a long neck and two bright stars for eyes.

=== The Midnight Descent ===
A central aspect of the myth holds that at midnight, unnoticed by anyone, the Yakana descends to Earth to drink water from the oceans and springs. This act fulfills a dual cosmic purpose:

1. It revitalizes the celestial river with water from the earthly plane, sustaining a closed, bidirectional cosmological hydrological cycle.
2. By consuming the excess terrestrial waters, the Yakana prevents the world from being destroyed by a catastrophic global flood.

=== The Myth of the Shepherd's Favor ===
The Huarochirí Manuscript also records a popular legend regarding the Yakana's interaction with humans. It is said that if a lucky person—usually a poor shepherd—is sleeping on the high plateaus (puna) at night and the Yakana lands directly on top of him, the man will experience a supernatural encounter. While the creature breathes on him, the man must pull a wool fiber from its chest. If he manages to do so, and subsequently sleeps, he will wake up to find wool of varying colors (blue, white, black, and brown). According to the tradition, if the shepherd then purchases a couple of llamas and breeds them while preserving that sacred wool, his herd will multiply by the thousands as a blessing from the celestial llama.

== Astronomical location ==
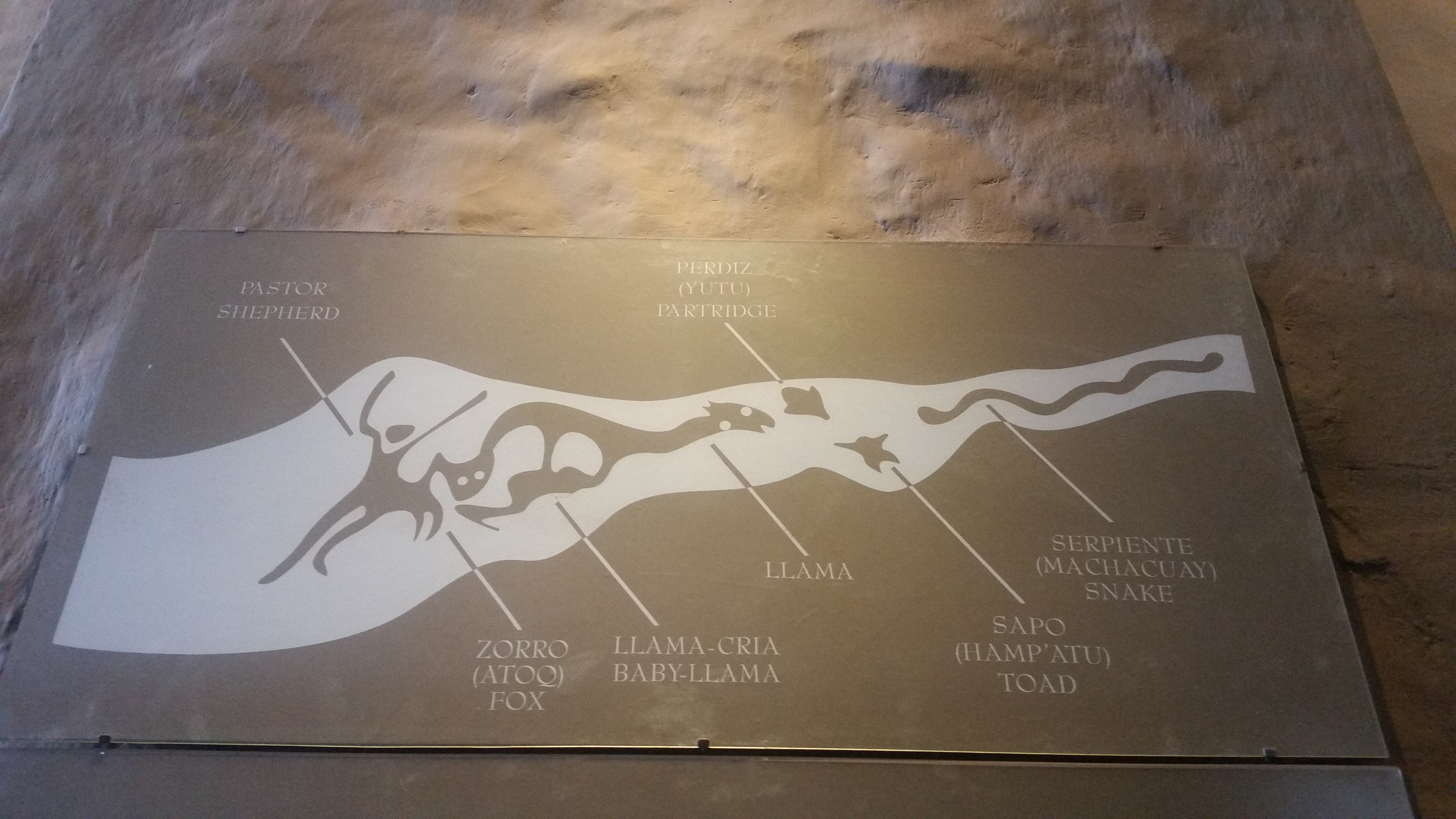
Illustration of Inca dark constellations, with Yakana (llama) and Uñallamacha (llama-cria) labeled

In Western astronomy, the body of the Yakana is located in the southern sky, stretching across the dark dust lanes between the constellations of Crux (the Southern Cross), Centaurus, and Scorpius.

Crucially, its eyes—traditionally called Llaman Ñawin or Ñawicuna—are formed by Alpha Centauri and Beta Centauri, two of the brightest stars in the southern hemisphere. This makes the Yakana a mixed constellation, combining a dark nebula body with bright stellar markers. Directly underneath her body lies the Uñallamacha (the llama calf), a smaller dark patch that represents her newborn offspring being nursed.

In 2026, the IAU Working Group on Star Names assigned the name Yaqana to the star Epsilon Normae, within this constellation. The name Uñallamacha was assigned to the star HD 155985 (HIP 84556), which was selected for its faintness.

== See also ==
- Andean dark constellations
- Inca astronomy
- Huarochirí Manuscript
- Dark nebula
