= Urioste =

Urioste is a surname. Notable people with the surname include:

- Armando de Urioste (1887–1951), Bolivian industrialist
- Camila Urioste (born 1980), Bolivian writer
- Frank J. Urioste (born 1938), American film editor
- George and Joanne Urioste (born c. 1952) and George Urioste (born c. 1937), American rock climbers
- Martha Urioste (1937–2022), American educator
