= Huarochirí Manuscript =

16th-century text in Classical Quechua

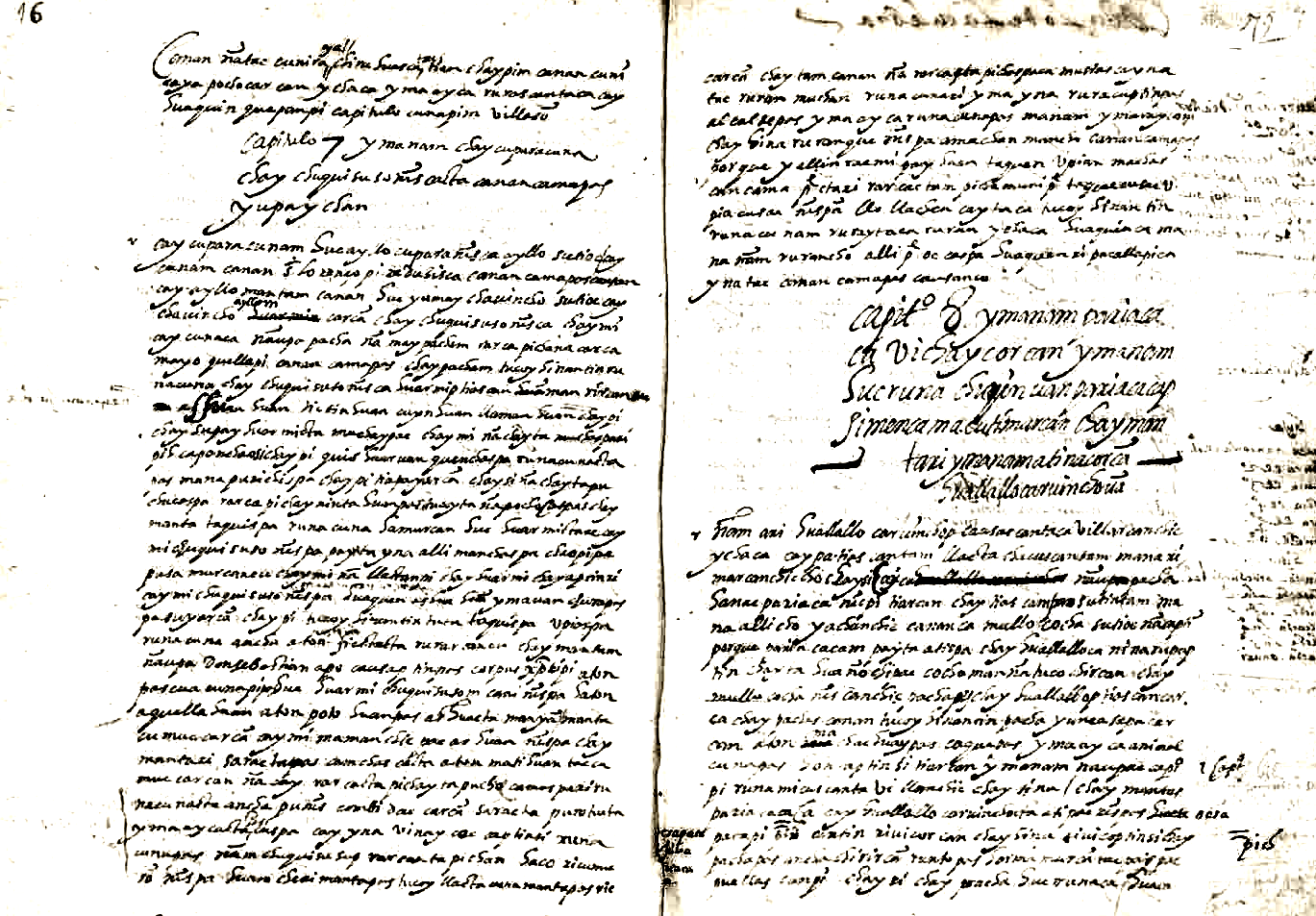
Chapter 7 and chapter 8 of the Huarochirí Manuscript

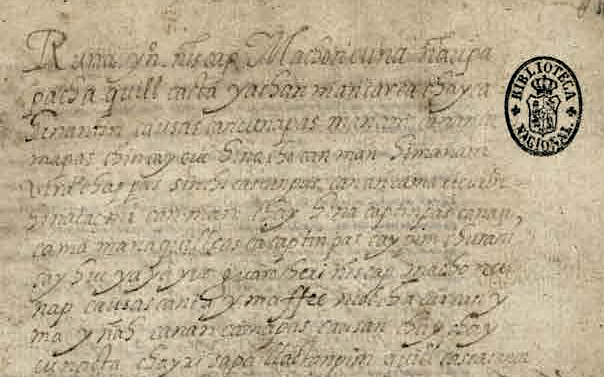
Beginning of the Manuscript

The Huarochirí manuscript (in modern Quechua spelling: Waruchiri) is a text in Classical Quechua from the late 16th century, describing myths, religious notions and traditions of the Quechua people of Huarochirí Province. The main roles in the myth are played by mountain deities (Huacas), including the rivals Paryaqaqa and Wallallu Qarwinchu, who also act as protectors of regional ethnicities (Huarochirí, Huanca). This text is an important monument of early colonial Quechua literature, because it is unique in its detailed description of the traditional beliefs of the indigenous Andean population of the former Inca Empire. It has been described as 'the closest thing to an Andean bible'.

== Authorship and purpose ==
The Huarochirí manuscript is the only surviving written source that records a prehispanic religious tradition of the Andes in an Andean language. As it was recorded decades after the entry of European colonists into the region, the retellings of these religious traditions were influenced by the preceding seventy years of colonial turbulence, including forced conversion and persecution. The manuscript was recorded and annotated by the Cuzco-born cleric Francisco de Ávila, who was responsible for the eradication of pagan beliefs – it is therefore considered ironic that the manuscript now preserves these very beliefs. The manuscript serves as a complex composite of testimonies and social memories, and the exact process of composition is unknown. It also contains many crossing-outs, tangents and marginal queries, likely those of Francisco de Ávila. It has been argued by Jorge Sanchez-Perez, Assistant Professor of Philosophy at the University of Alberta, that de Ávila's purpose was to use the myths recorded to prove the supposed superiority of the Christian faith, and to profess that he had been given foresight of these beliefs when attempting the conversion of indigenous peoples. The work of Huarochirí specialist Sarah Bennison of the University of St Andrews argues that both the colonial Huarochirí Manuscript and the twentieth-century Entablo Manuscript are intimately tied to khipu ('quipu') accountancy.

== Rediscovery ==
For centuries, the manuscript was forgotten in the royal library of Madrid. German ethnologist Hermann Trimborn discovered the document in Madrid, translated it into German and published a bilingual edition in 1939. Most of it was destroyed in the Second World War. An expanded and re-worked edition in collaboration with Antje Kelm was published in 1967. In 1966, Peruvian writer and anthropologist José María Arguedas translated the text into Spanish for the first time and also published a bilingual edition (Quechua and Spanish).

== Analysis ==
=== Death and afterlife ===
The indigenous peoples of Huarochirí in the Andean region would offer nourishment and beverages to their deceased, believing that the departed would embark to Paria Caca and that it was imperative to honor their deceased through these rituals. The manuscript suggested that death endured for five days, following which the departed reunited with the living:

"The dead used to come back after five days. When they were about to return, people waited for them with prepared food and drinks. When the dead arrived, they’d just say, 'I’m back!' and rejoice immensely in the company of their elders and their brothers. They’d say, 'Now I’ll never die again forever!' "

=== Supplementary chapters ===
The two supplementary chapters of the manuscript have been analysed by Sarah Bennison of the University of St Andrews. These supplements describe the traditions of the indigenous population (specifically the "San Damián Checa" kin group) in relation to the significance of twin births and babies born with distinctive hair growth patterns (a double crown, as proposed by Bennison). According to this scholar, these two strands of customs (ie rituals for twins and for double crowns) are intimately related, both being indicative of lightning worship.

=== Comparison with other documents ===
Scholars have drawn comparisons between the Huarochirí Manuscript and the early twentieth-century Entablo Manuscript, also from Huarochirí (specifically, the village of San Pedro de Casta), which describes San Pedro de Casta's ritual water laws in predominantly Spanish language from a local point of view.

== Content ==
The manuscript contains 31 chapters and 2 supplementary chapters.

=== Chapter 1 ===
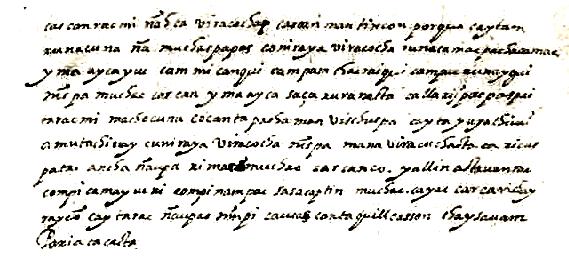
Ending of chapter 1: Prayer to Coniraya Viracocha

The first chapter records the sequence of principal huacas. Huacas would battle for this title, which allowed them to transmit life force to humans. The first huacas mentioned are the ancient Yanañamca and Tutañamca, of which little is known. They were overthrown by Huallallo Carhuincho, who was the first to transmit life force to humans. In his time, the region had red and yellow parrots, the harvest could take place five days after sowing, and people would come back to life five days after dying. This reincarnation meant that the population grew rapidly and people had to migrate into the mountains to find a place to live. Huallallo only allowed two children per family, one of which he would eat.

Huallallo was deposed by the Pariacaca and banished to the region of the Antis along with his parrots. Nearly all of the rest of the manuscript is about the life of Pariacaca. He was the principal Huaca when the Incas first arrived in the region.

The Incas also introduced other huacas, one of which, Cuniraya Huiracocha, is also mentioned in the first chapter of the manuscript. He was combination of a local huaca, Cuniraya, and Huiracocha, who was the Incan creator God, widely known but not universally venerated. This syncretism allowed the Incas to expand their influence. Later in the manuscript, it is argued that, as Huiracocha was the creator god, he must be father of Pariacaca.

=== Chapter 2 ===
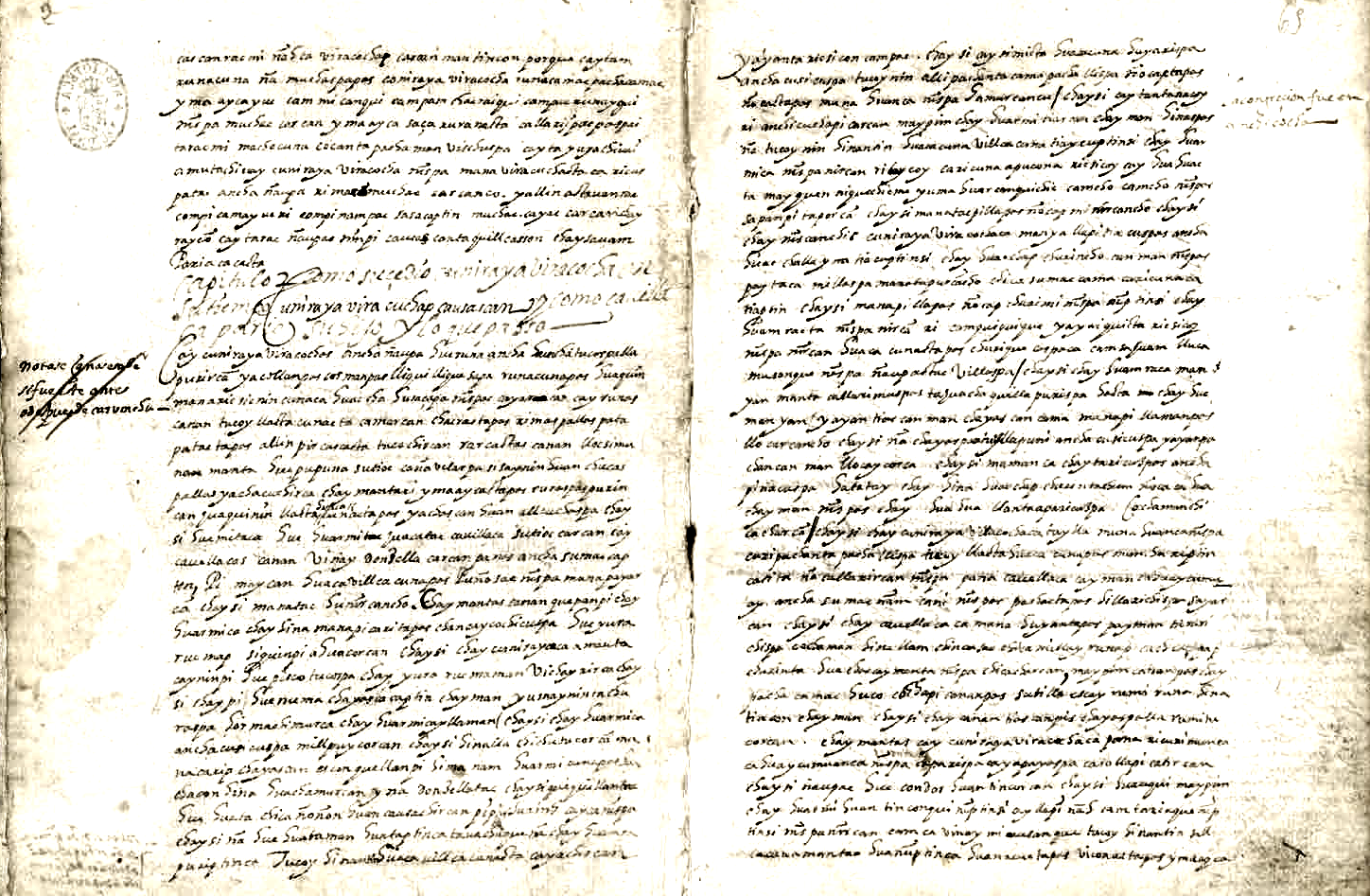
Chapter 2: cuniraya vira cochap causascan – Life of Cuniraya Viracocha

This chapter features themes encountered in many mythologies: omnipotent gods and pregnant virgins. It begins with an itinerant Cuniraya disguised as a beggar. Prompted by other huacas' scorn for his appearance, he miraculously tills the fields and constructs andenes merely by speaking, and digs irrigation ditches with the brush of a reed flower. This humiliates the other huacas.

One day he encounters Cahuillan, a beautiful virgin. She was desired by all the huacas, whose advances she rejected. Seated below a lúcuma tree, Cuniraya transforms into a bird and inseminates a ripe fruit of the tree, which he lets falls beside Cahuillan. She eats the fruit and becomes pregnant. Once the baby, a boy, is born and starts to crawl, Cahuillan gathers the huacas to ask which was the father. None volunteers himself, and the disguised Cuniraya is overlooked. Cahuillan allows the child to crawl freely, reasoning that he will find his father, and he goes to Cunirayan. Cahuillan is dismayed to have given birth to the child of an apparently lowly man. She picks up the child and flees in the direction of the ocean. Cuniraya reveals his true self, illuminating the land, but Cahuillan, facing away, does not notice.

Cuniraya starts to chase after Cahuillan, speaking to various animals. He blesses those giving encouragement, and curses those who are not supportive: the condor is blessed to eat all dead animals, and to cause animals which eat it to die; the female skunk is cursed to walk at night, hated and stinking; the puma is blessed to eat the llamas of humans, and be honoured by festivities and sacrifices if killed by them; the fox is cursed to be hated by humans and discarded when killed; the falcon is blessed to be lucky, to eat hummingbirds, and to be wept over and offered sacrifices if killed; the parrot is cursed to constantly shriek.

Finally Cuniraya reaches the coast, near the temple of Pachacamac, but neither Cahuillan nor her son are there; they have become two islands, which remain to this day. This was considered an excellent fate. Cuniraya goes to the temple, where two of his daughters remain, guarded by a snake while their mother visits the new islands. Cuniraya, angry that the mother is visiting the islands that had escaped his reach, rapes the elder daughter, and tries to rape the younger, but she escapes by transforming into a dove and fleeing. Cuniraya then populates a local lake with the first fish, which he releases into the ocean.

When the mother returns and is informed by her daughters what had happened, she pursues Cuniraya. She tells him that she wishes to remove fleas from him, hoping to trick him and strike him with a rock. Cuniraya realises the ploy and leaves on the pretext of going to the toilet, escaping to other lands.

=== Chapter 3 ===
Chapters 3 and 4 tell stories of the most ancient humans, before the time of Pariacaca. They contain themes familiar to the Catholics who produced the manuscript: surviving the great flood, as in the story of Noah's Ark, and a period of darkness, like that which followed the death of Jesus.

In chapter 3, all the animals have a presentiment that the ocean is going to overflow, and so they begin to migrate to higher altitudes. The central character is a llama, who is unable to migrate because it is being led by its owner. The concerned llama refuses to eat, despite having good pasture. The frustrated owner throws a deseeded cob (coronta) of choclo corn at it, and commands it to eat. The angry llama becomes capable of speech, and explains that the world will end in five days' time. He commands his master to pack food for five days and carry him to the mountain Huillcacoto.

As soon as they arrive at the mountain, where all the animals have congregated, the ocean floods over the land, submerging everything but the peak of Huillcacoto. This becomes so crowded that the fox's tail dips in the water, explaining why it is black. All the other humans are killed by the flood. (It is not mentioned whether a female human also survives). After five days, the water subsides, and the animals spread out and repopulate the Earth.

=== Chapter 4 ===
The fourth chapter begins with the 'death' of the Sun. There are five days of complete darkness. Rocks begin to move themselves and knock together. Even the batans and mortars come to life and consume humans. Llamas began to pursue humans. The rebellion of animals and objects is also a theme of Moche iconography, which predates the manuscript by a millennium.

=== Chapter 5 ===
This chapter discusses the birth of Pariacaca. Before his birth, the world was consumed by chaos and conflict, and the people lived under deceptive leaders. Tantañamca pretends to be a wise huaca to gain power and wealth. He lives in a house covered by parrot wings, and owned blue, red and yellow llamas. Nonetheless, he falls sick. It happens that a poor, humble man, Huatiacuri, passes by on the path from the ocean. He is heading for the mountain Condorcoto to witness the birth of Pariacaca his father (a strange concept, not explained in the text). While Huatiacuri rests, he overhears a conversation between two foxes, one from the mountains and one from the coast. He hears about the false huaca's incurable illness. The mountain fox goes on to reveal the strange cause of Tantañamca's illness: in his house, a grain of maize flew out of a cooking pot and touched his wife's genitals. The wife, not realising this, went on to feed the maize to another man. This 'indirect adultery' brought a plague on the house: snakes living in the roof, and a two-headed toad living beneath the batán, both sapping Tantañamca's energy.

Armed with this information, Huatiacuri approaches the house and askes if any within have illnesses in need of a cure. The youngest daughter of Tantañamca, Chaupiñamca, tells him about her father's illness, and he replies that he will cure it, but only if she will be his partner. She relays this information to her father, who accepts the offer, despite his advisors, who mock the unassuming Huatiacuri. The offer, and its acceptance, enrages the husband of Tantañamca's oldest daughter, who doesn't want a poor man to join the family. Nonetheless, Huatiacuri proceeds to tell them about the serpents and the toad, and how they had been brought by Tantañamca's wife's 'infidelity'. The wife denies this until Huatiacuri explains the circumstance of the grain of maize, which she remembers. Tantañamca orders that the house be destroyed and the serpents killed. As they lift the batán, the two-headed toad flies away towards a spring, said to cause men to disappear. (The author of the manuscript noted to himself that they should try to find the location of this spring.)

Huatiacuri then reprimands Tantañamca for pretending to be a huaca, and tries to convince him to instead accept Pariacaca. Naturally, Huatiacuri then remembers the purpose of his journey—to witness the birth of Pariacaca—and hurriedly resumes his journey, now accompanied by Chaupiñamca. At last, they find Pariacaca, in the form of five eggs.

Huatiacuri and Chaupiñamca then sleep together, further displeasing the husband of Chaupiñamca's sister. He begins to formulate a plan to undo Huatiacuri; to cause him to fall from grace.

== Literature / editions ==
- Hermann Trimborn: Dämonen und Zauber im Inkareich. Quellen und Forschungen zur Geschichte der Völkerkunde, Leipzig 1939.
- Hermann Trimborn, Antje Kelm: Götter und Kulte in Huarochirí. Quellenwerke zur alten Geschichte Amerikas aufgezeichnet in den Sprachen der Eingeborenen, Band 8. Verlag Mann, 1967.
- José María Arguedas: Dioses y Hombres de Huarochirí (1966). Quechua text with Spanish translation
- Huarochirí – An Andean Society Under Inca and Spanish Rule. Author: Karen Spalding (1984)
- Gérald Taylor: Rites et Traditions de Huarochirí. (1995)
- Frank Salomon, George L. Urioste: Huarochirí Manuscript: A Testament of Ancient and Colonial Andean Religion (1991). [Quechua original and English translation by Frank Salomon and George L. Urioste]

== See also ==
- Florentine Codex
- Popol Wuj
