= Pariacaca (god) =

Inca god of storms

In Incan and pre-Incan mythology, Pariacaca (contemporary Quechua spelling: Parya Qaqa) was a god of storms, as well as a creator god. His life is described in the first chapter of the Huarochirí Manuscript.

== Mythology ==
There are many versions of the myths around Pariacaca.

In one version, five eggs appeared on the summit of the sacred mountain Kuntur Quta, from which hatched Pariacaca and his brothers. Pariacaca's first action was to call down a great flood to punish a rich man who had declared himself a god. Before the floods arrived, Pariacaca, dressed as a beggar, went down to a fiesta at a pueblo near Huarochirí where he was ignored by everyone except for one compassionate woman. In return for her kindness, Pariacaca told the woman that the floods would destroy everyone in five days and allowed her, her children, and her immediate family to flee to higher grounds so long as she did not warn anyone else about the floods.

In another version, Pariacaca is the father of a person, also dressed in beggar's rags, named Huathiacuri. Huathiacuri cured a rich man of an illness and was rewarded with the younger of the rich man's two daughters. Huathiacuri was challenged by his brother-in-law to a battle of wits and his father Pariacaca, who was one of five sacred eggs on the mountain Kuntur Quta and an oracle, advised him to accept the challenge.

According to the legend that speaks about this god and his generosity, Pariacaca saw a humble man crying sitting on the shore so he stopped his divine life and came down from the world of the gods to see what was wrong. He approached him and dared to ask him the reason for his melancholy. He answered that the god Wallallu Qarhwinchu had threatened his people with burning the town if they did not give him human sacrifices since, previously, they had been offering them dogs (even, under the belief of some, the huancas themselves fed on these animals and that is why the huancas used to be called "dog-eaters"). Pariacaca confronted Wallallu, the god of fire, for being the divinity of the people and in the battle Pariacaca was the winner because he was able to extinguish his fireballs with the rains, which banished him and condemned him to eat carrion. Before this victory, the god Pariacaca became very adored in the town for freeing them from the god Wallallu, who was sentenced to eat dogs for having been a devourer of men.
