= Andean dark constellations =

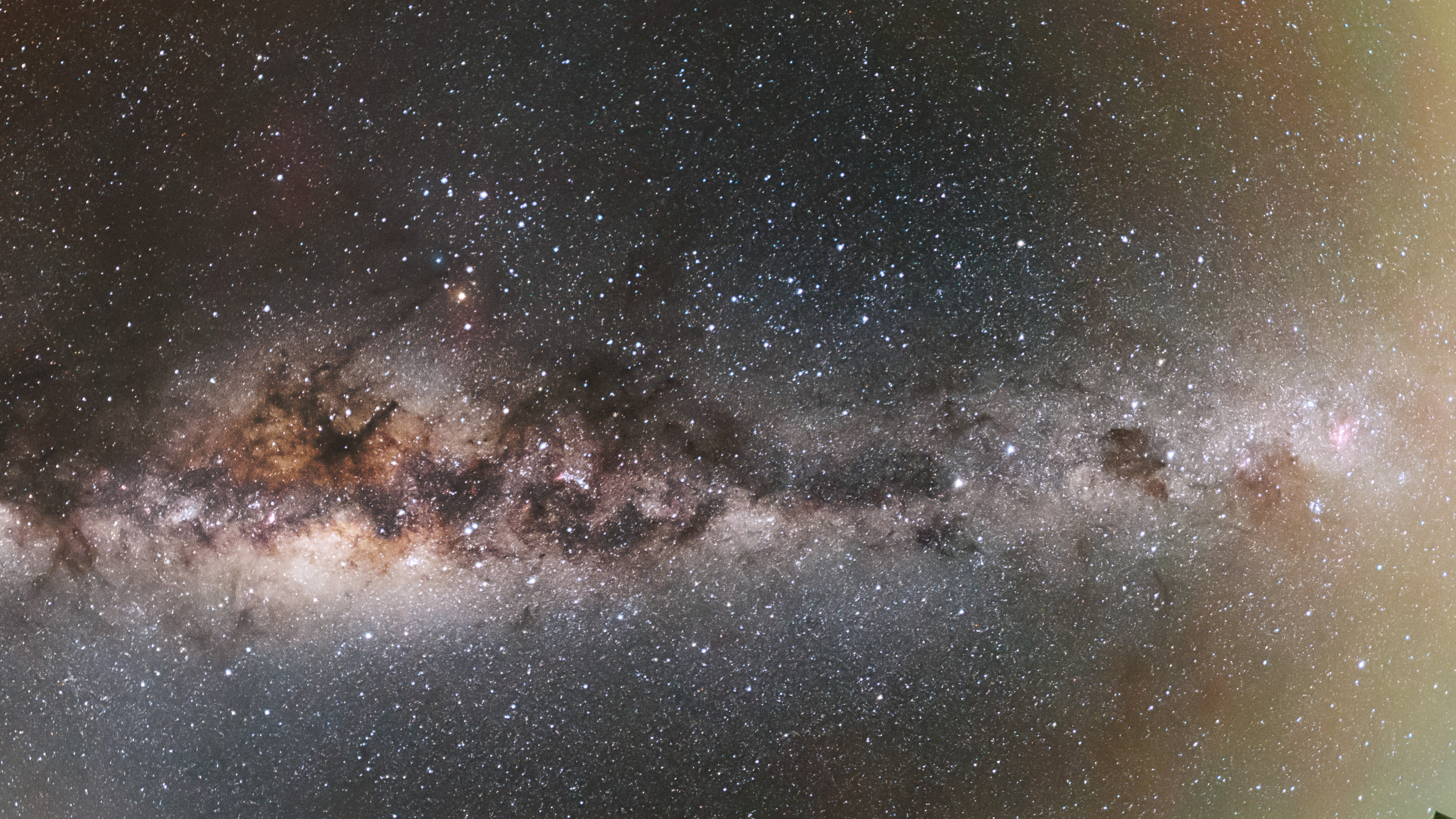
The Milky Way, known as Mayu (Celestial River) in Quechua, where the Andean dark constellations are formed by cosmic dust lanes.

Andean dark constellations (Quechua:yana phuyu, lit. 'black cloud'; (Aymara:ch'iyar warawara) are astronomical configurations identified by pre-Columbian civilizations of the Andes region (primarily within the modern territories of Bolivia and Peru). Unlike the traditional Western practice of grouping bright stars, these constellations are based on the dark silhouettes formed by molecular clouds and interstellar dust lanes located along the Milky Way.

While Western astronomy constructed its zodiac and constellations by connecting points of starlight with imaginary lines (known as "bright" or star constellations), Andean archaeoastronomy attributed fundamental spiritual, mythical, and practical significance to the shaded areas or dark nebulae that blot out the light of the galactic background.

== Cosmological and geographical context ==
In the Altiplano regions of the Central Andes, low atmospheric humidity and high altitudes—frequently exceeding 3,500 meters above sea level (m a.s.l.)—provide exceptional visibility of the night sky. From this geographical vantage point, the dense band of the Milky Way spans across the celestial dome with striking prominence.

In indigenous languages, the Milky Way is referred to as Mayu (in Quechua, "Celestial River") or Wara Wara Jawira (in Aymara, "River of Stars"). In the Andean worldview, the Milky Way is not merely a stellar background, but a constantly moving cosmic river known as Mayu. There is a direct physical and spiritual connection between the rivers of the Earth and the Mayu. The Andean peoples conceived a closed, cosmic hydrological cycle: as the Celestial River circles the Earth, it absorbs water from terrestrial oceans and rivers, transports it across the sky, and returns it in the form of fertilizing rain. Therefore, the dark constellations (yana phuyu) do not float in a vacuum; rather, they are animate beings that inhabit, drink from, and swim within this surging river of interstellar dust. Furthermore, it was believed that these celestial animals descended to drink from the river at midnight to prevent excess water from causing catastrophic floods on Earth.

== Main dark constellations ==
According to chronicles from the 16th and 17th centuries, as well as contemporary ethnoastronomical research led by anthropologists such as Gary Urton, these interstellar silhouettes predominantly correspond to the local fauna of the Andean ecosystem:

Catalog of the Primary Andean Dark Figures
Native name	Translation	Western astronomical location	Meaning and symbolism
Yakana' or Qatachillay	The Celestial Llama	Dust cloud between Crux (the Southern Cross), Centaurus, and Scorpius.	The largest silhouette; it walks through the center of the Mayu and represents a mother llama nursing her calf, symbolizing vital energy (camac) and the protection of terrestrial camelid herds. Mythologically, she descends to Earth to drink from the oceans to regulate water levels.
Uñallamita	The llama calf	Located directly beneath the body of the Yakana.	A small dark patch representing a newborn calf being nursed by its celestial mother.
Llaman Ñawin	The eyes of the llama	Stars Alpha Centauri and Beta Centauri.	A mixed exception where two bright, first-magnitude stars (traditionally known as Ñawicuna) precisely define the eyes of the llama's dark silhouette.
Mach'acuay or Tchari	The Serpent	Sinuous band of dark dust between Adhara and Scorpius.	Represents a serpent that controls the underworld and underground waters. Its head emerges in the firmament precisely during the month of August, coinciding with the end of the harvest and the ritual awakening of Pachamama (Mother Earth), disappearing when the earth goes to rest.
Hanp'atu or Misckan	The Toad	Dark nebula near the Southern Cross.	A symbol of rain, standing water, and the fertility of agricultural soils.
Yutu, Lluthu or Ckolan	The Partridge	Coalsack Nebula.	Represents a tinamou bird native to the puna o altiplano ecosystem. Its orientation traditionally indicated the proximity of the solstices.
Atoq or Tchapur	The Fox	Dark patch located near the tail of Scorpius.	The personification of cunning; it roams the banks of the celestial river and, in Andean creation myths, acts as an ecological mediator, locked in a perpetual pursuit of the Celestial Llama and her calf.
Añash	The Skunk	Dark nebula near Crux and Centaurus.	Like the fox, it represents a clever animal that wanders along the margins of the Mayu, serving as a mediator in indigenous cosmological narratives.
Michiq or Labun	The Shepherd	Dark silhouette preceding the Yakana.	Represents the human figure tasked with protecting and guiding the celestial herds.

== Sociocultural and agroastronomical function ==
The observation of the yana phuyu (dark constellations) served a purpose far beyond mere mythology; it was a fundamental tool for phenology and formed the backbone of economic, architectural, and agricultural planning for the Aymara kingdoms and the Inca Empire.

- Agricultural calendar: The appearance, transit, and disappearance of specific dark figures on the eastern horizon at dawn indicated the start of planting cycles (such as for the potato), harvesting, or the seasons for shearing and breeding alpacas and llamas.

=== The Milky Way and the Qhapaq Ñan ===
The orientation of the dark clouds and the dynamic geometry of the Mayu during key moments of the astronomical year directly influenced the engineering and planning of imperial infrastructure. The layout and design of the Qhapaq Ñan (the Great Inka Road system), as well as the spatial distribution of major political-ceremonial centers and the ceque systems (sacred radial lines of shrines or huacas) in Cusco, were not random; they were projected as a terrestrial mirror or reflection of the celestial map. This enabled the Inca administration to coordinate with chronological precision the rituals of reciprocity, resource mobilization, and productive cycles across thousands of kilometers of the mountain range.

=== Meteorological prediction ===
Community astronomers, known in the contemporary Altiplano context as yatiris, assessed the sharpness or degree of obscuration of these galactic patches. They frequently used this data in combination with observations of the Pleiades cluster (Qollqa) during the winter solstice (Inti Raymi). If the interstellar dust was observed with high definition, it denoted low atmospheric humidity, and a year of drought was forecast. Conversely, if the patches appeared fuzzy or veiled by high-altitude cloud cover, it served as an accurate indicator of a year with abundant rainfall or the imminent arrival of global climate anomalies such as El Niño.

== Preservation of knowledge ==
Following the establishment of Spanish colonial rule in the 16th century, these organized systems of stellar interpretation faced severe suppression through the extirpation of idolatries. However, a significant portion of this knowledge survived through oral tradition and traditional Andean textile arts. In the 21st century, indigenous communities in the highlands of Bolivia, northern Chile, and southern Peru continue to utilize the position of the Milky Way and its dark patches as a key reference for agricultural land management.

== See also ==
- Inca astronomy
- Arqueoastronomy
- Constellation
- Dark nebula
- Inca mythology
