= George and Joanne Urioste =

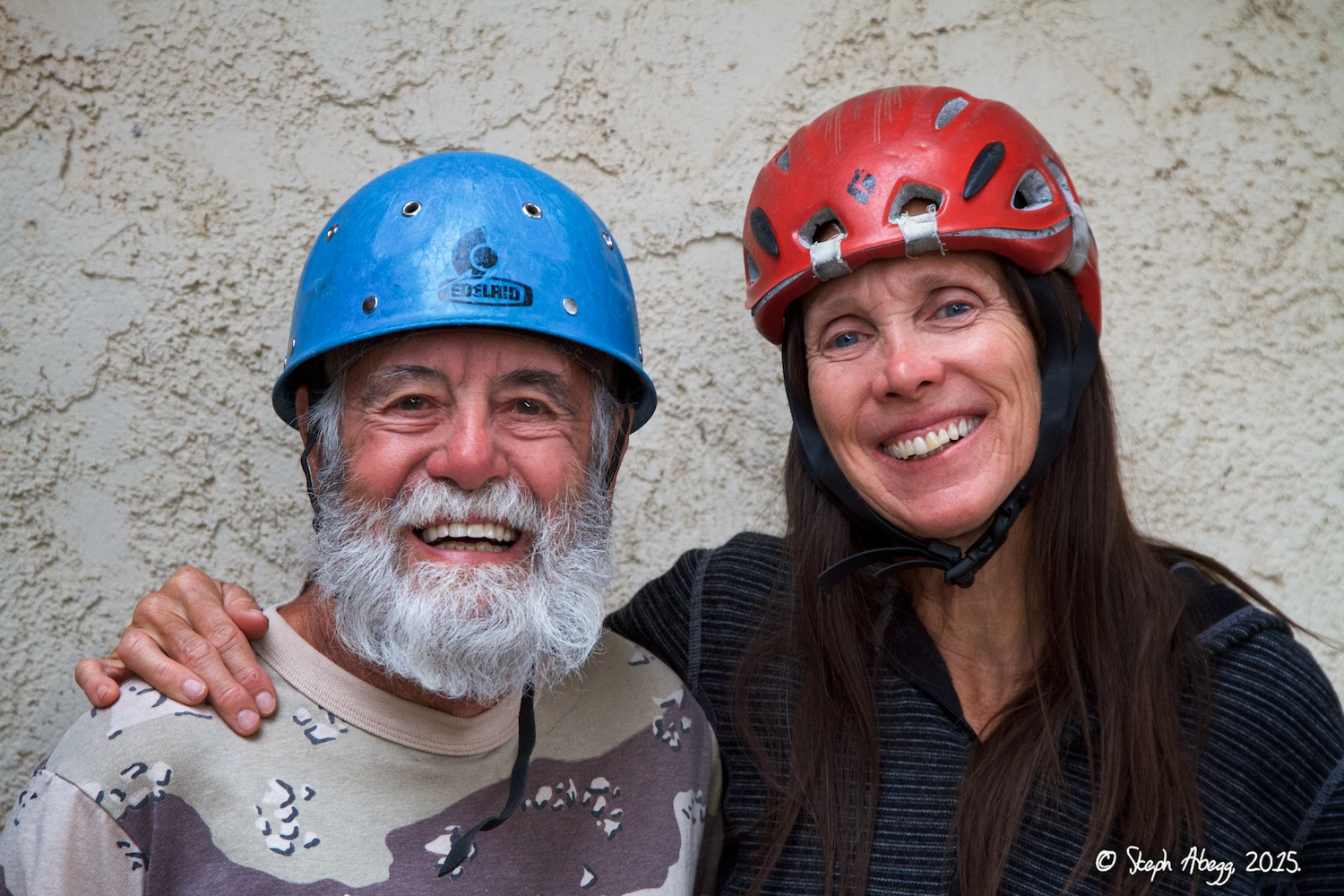
- Jorge and Joanne Urioste in March 2015
- Occupation: rock climbers
- Known for: route development and first ascents in Red Rock Canyon

Joanne Urioste
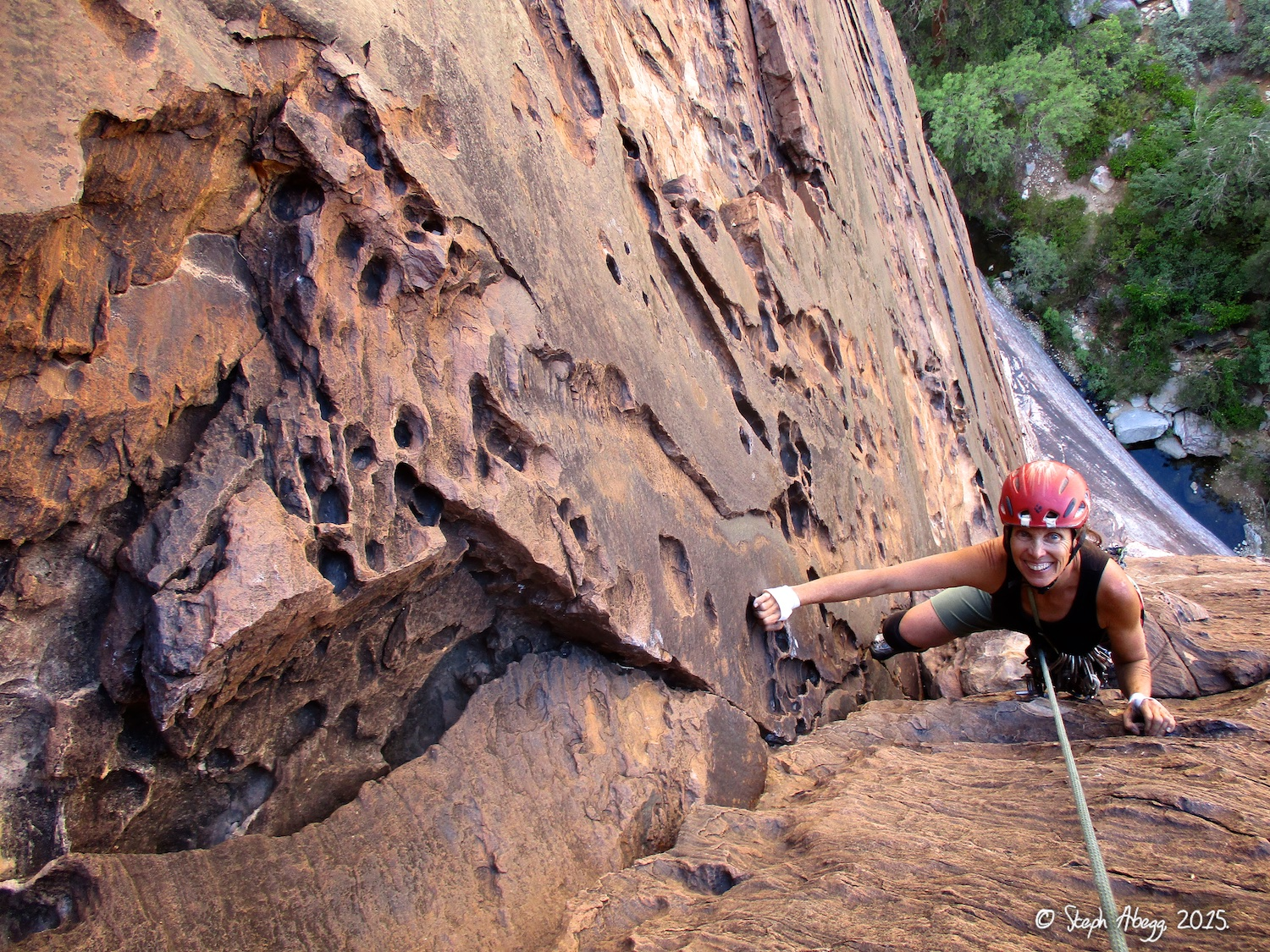
- Joanne Urioste climbing Dark Shadows
- Born: circa 1952; New York
- Occupations: guide book author, guide, registered nurse & rock climber

George Urioste
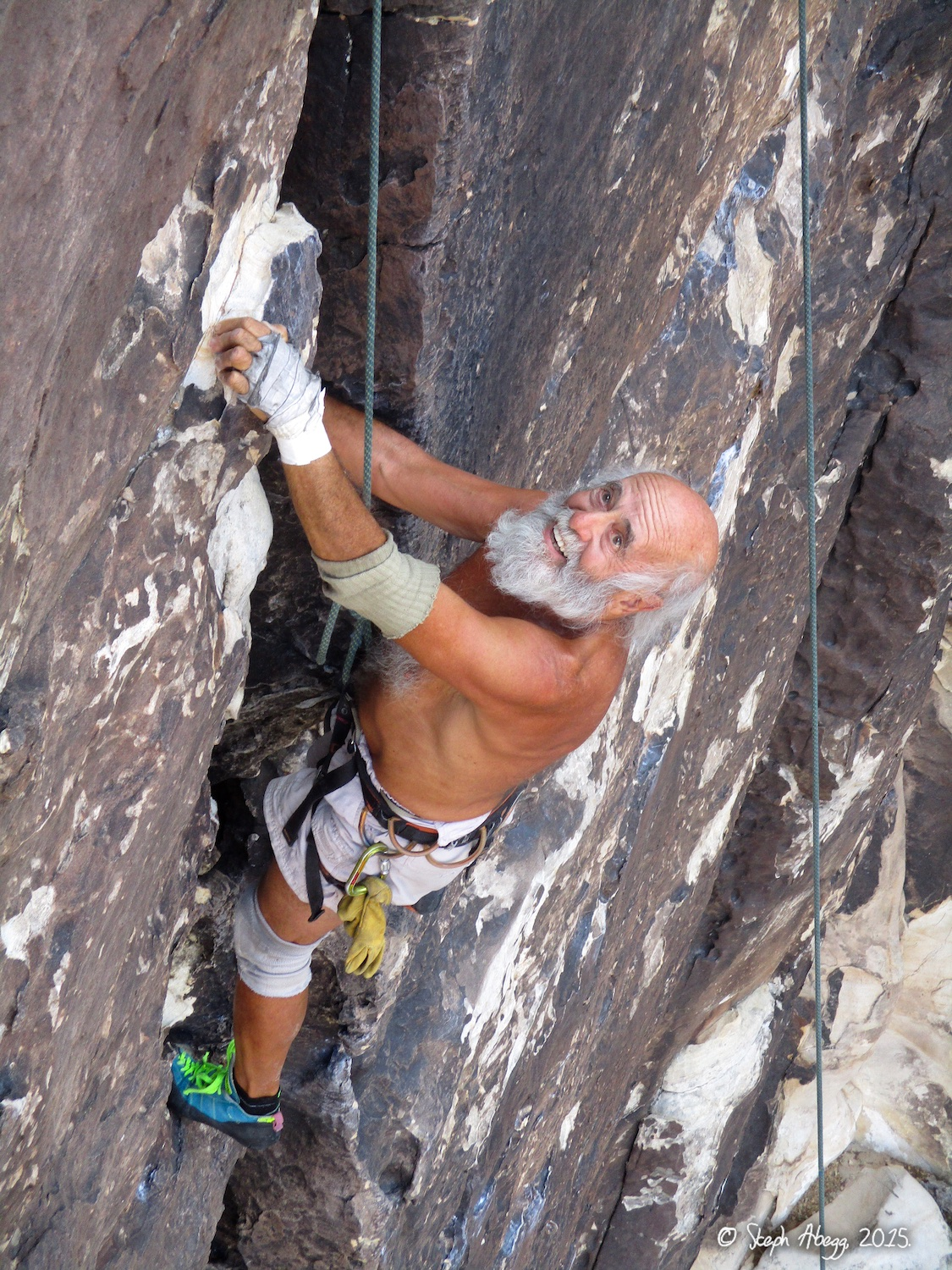
- Jorge Urioste climbing Black Track
- Born: circa 1937; Chile
- Other name: Jorge Urioste
- Occupations: linguist, rock climber

Joanne Urioste (born c. 1952) and George Urioste (born c. 1937) are American rock climbers, who made over a hundred first ascents, in Red Rock Canyon.

George Urioste, also known as Jorge Urioste, was born in Chile, to a Bolivian father, and holds citizenship in both countries. Jorge became a Jesuit priest, and moved to the United States to study at Cornell University. There he met and started climbing with Joanne. Joanne grew up in Brooklyn and worked on her bachelor's degree in life science at Cornell, while George was working on his PhD. In 1974, having just finished their studies, they married and moved to Las Vegas, where George began teaching anthropology and linguistics at University of Nevada, Las Vegas.

In the next decade, they established over a hundred new routes, many of which, such as Crimson Chrysalis, Epinephrine, Dream of Wild Turkeys and Levitation 29 are now some of Red Rock's most famous and popular climbs. The popularity of Urioste routes stems from the fact that most are long multi-pitch routes, following striking lines, and which were made relatively safe by placing bolts in blank sections. That resulted in some climbs which were strongly opposed by some local climbers at the time (mid 1970s to mid 1980s), who emphasized bolt-free boldness in their ascents. In 1984 Joanne wrote a climbing guide book, The Red Rocks of Southern Nevada.

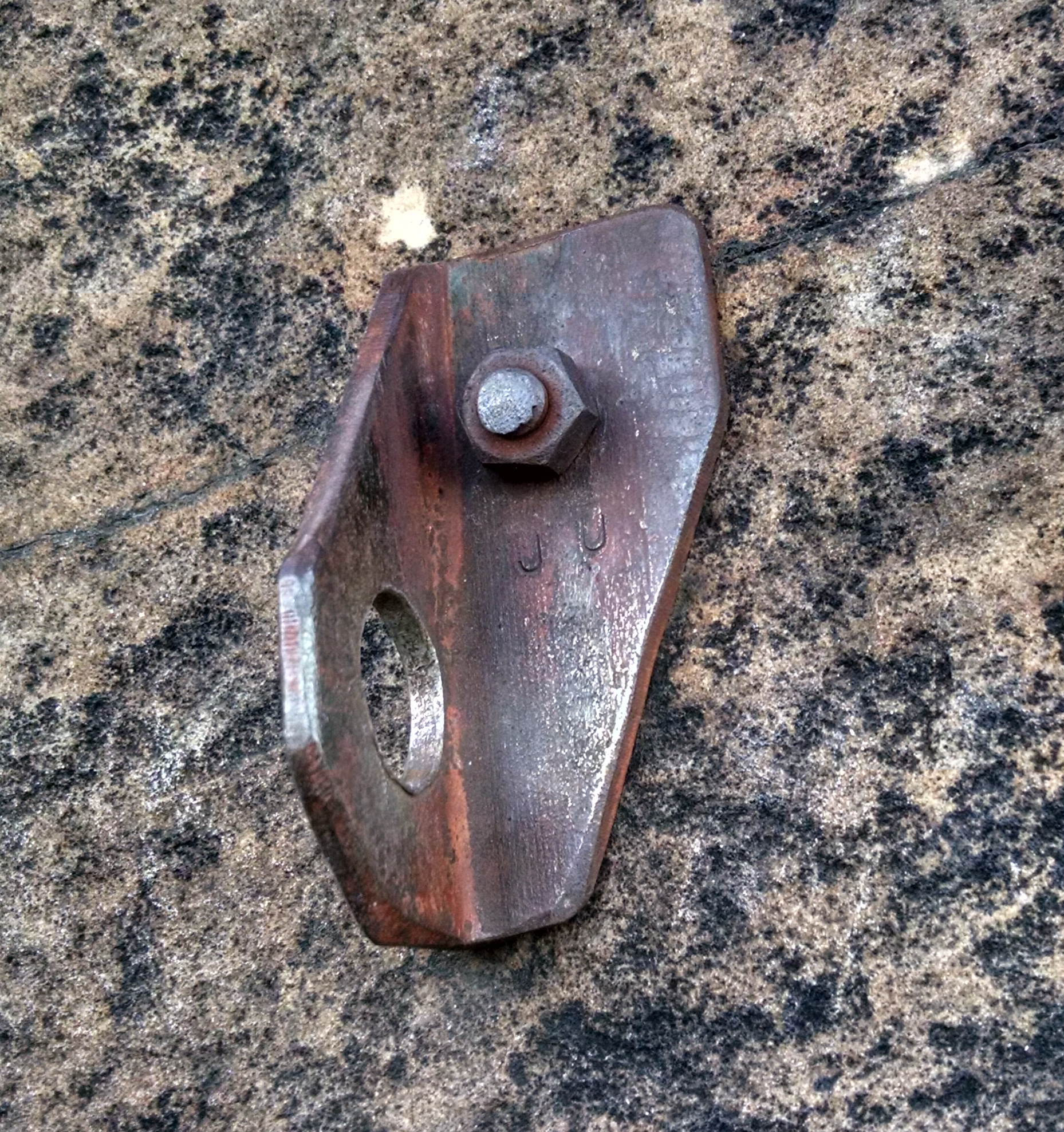
One of hundreds of iconic home-made climbing bolts used by Uriostes for their climbs. Many of them were since replaced by modern hardware.

In 1986, after the arrival of their children, they retired from climbing for ten years, during which Joanne took up ultra distance running, especially through wilderness and mountains, having completed six one hundred mile races, as well as 165 miles on the John Muir Trail (Whitney Portal to Red's Meadow; in 1996) in five days flat, solo, and self supported. After their ten-year retirement from climbing, they returned and are continuing to establish a number of significant routes in Red Rock, some of which are 1500 to 2400 feet long (Inti Watana, Gift of the Wind Gods, Woman of Mountain Dreams, Twixt Cradle and Stone, and Slim).

George taught anthropology and linguistics at University of Nevada for over 35 years and is fluent in English, Spanish, Italian, French, Quechua, Catalan, and some German. Joanne has been working as a registered nurse since 1999.

== Well-known climbs established by the Uriostes ==
- Cat in the Hat (6 pitches 5.6)
- Olive Oil (5 pitches 5.7)
- Frogland (6 pitches 5.8)
- Crimson Chrysalis (9 pitches 5.8+)
- Refried Brains (4 pitches 5.9)
- Epinephrine (13 pitches 5.9)
- Black Orpheus (8 pitches 5.9+)
- Sour Mash (6 pitches 5.10a)
- Dream of Wild Turkeys (7 pitches 5.10a)
- Prince of Darkness (6 pitches 5.10c)
- Inti Watana (12 pitches 5.10c)
- Gift of the Wind Gods (10 pitches 5.10c)
- The Nightcrawler (5 pitches 5.10+)
- Twixt Cradle and Stone (8 pitches 5.10d)
- Gift of the Wind Gods (10 pitches 5.10)
- Eagle Dance (11 pitches 5.10b/c A0)
- Levitation 29 (9 pitches 5.11)
- Woman of Mountain Dreams (17 pitches 5.11a/b)
- Ixtlan (3 pitches 5.11c)

== George Urioste Bibliography ==
- Frank Salomon, George L. Urioste: Huarochirí Manuscript: A Testament of Ancient and Colonial Andean Religion (1991). [Quechua original and English translation by Frank Salomon and George L. Urioste]

== Joanne Urioste Bibliography ==
- Joanne Urioste: Collages of Rock & Desire: Re-imagining Climbing in Red Rock, Risk in the Andes & Running into Dreams (2025).
