= McGowan =

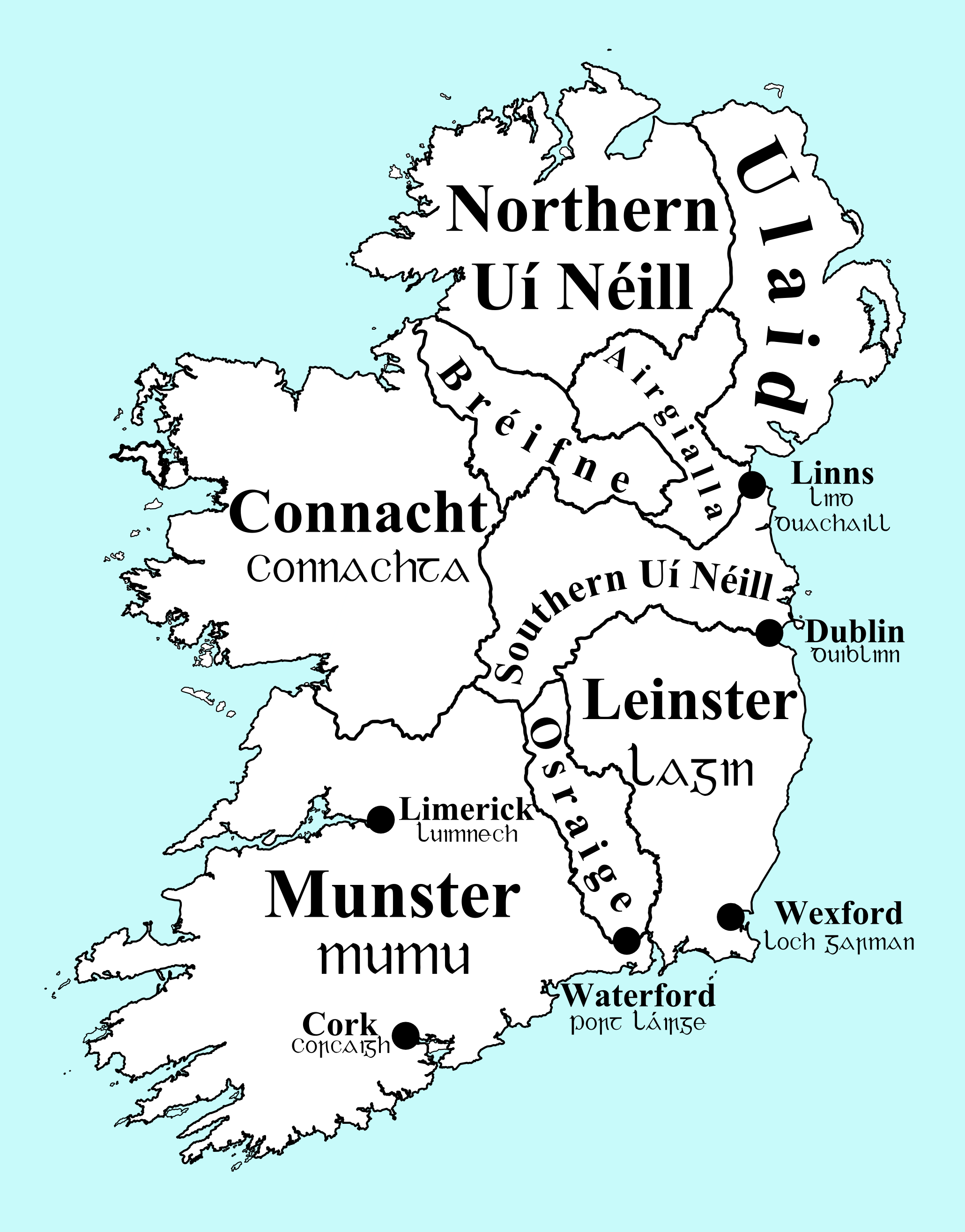
Gaelic Ireland and the over-kingdom of Ulaid circa 900 A.D.

McGowan /məˈɡaʊən/ is an Irish and Scottish surname. It is an anglicisation of the Irish Mac Gabhann and Scottish Mac Gobhann, both of which mean 'son of (the) smith'. Belonging to the Uí Echach Cobo, located in modern-day western County Down in Ulster, they were of the same stock as the McGuinness clan.

== Meaning ==
As noted further in the source by John O'Hart, though not an occupational surname, MacGowan evolves as an Anglicisation of the original Irish language personal description or nickname gobha, meaning 'blacksmith'. For this reason, the surnames of some septs of the MacGowan are alternately anglicised to Smythe or Smith. The surname MacGowan, therefore, translates from Irish to English as 'son of (the) smith'.

== Scottish origins ==
In Scotland, Mac an Ghobhain was anglicised to MacGowan. Mac Gobha, later McGow, was also made MacGowan. As the maker of arms and armour, the smith was an important hereditary position in each clan and there were MacGowans, or MacGouns, found throughout the Highlands. The two most important septs, however, were the MacGowans of Clan Donald (only to be found in Antrim and South Uist) and those of Clan MacPherson.

There was also an Irish-Scot Clan MacGowan recorded in fourteenth-century Nithsdale in Dumfriesshire. The Irish origins of this clan suggest that the Scottish Clan MacGowan may descend from the same eponymous ancestor as those in Ireland who bear the name, with the Scottish branch of the clan having fled to Scotland during the Norman occupation of Ireland. Separately, in Stirlingshire there was an old family of MacGowans of uncertain origin.

== Irish origins ==
In Ireland the name MacGowan refers to an eponymous ancestor, Aengus an Gobhain ("Angus the Smith") or Áengus Goibnenn mac Fergus Gallen mheic Tibraide Tirech, who was a High King of Ulster and the son of Fergus Galeng, son of Tipraiti Tireach.

The MacGowans were formerly chiefs in Dalariada, a principality in eastern Ulidia. However, they were driven to Donegal, Cavan, and Sligo in the 12th century due to English invasions in eastern Ireland. The MacGowans who settled in Sligo had their home at Castlegowan in Sligo, and thereafter a great number of them moved to Rossinver Parish in Leitrim. The name McGowan is now very popular in County Sligo and County Leitrim. The name McGowan is particularly common in the parish of Manorhamilton in Leitrim.

This family gave birth to many eminent ecclesiastics and literary men, and among the latter class may be mentioned Tadg Mac-an-Gowan, chief historiographer to the O'Connors towards the close of the 14th century; Felan M'an- Gowan by whom, assisted by the O'Dugans of East Galway, was compiled the Book of the O'Kellys, commonly called the Book of Hy-Many; and the no less distinguished ecclesiastical writer, Angus Ceile De M'anGowan, author of Lives of the Irish Saints and other tracts, who lived in the third quarter of the 8th century, and of whom the following pedigree is preserved.

As for the MacGowans who remained in the northeast of Ireland (in Antrim specifically), this family would later be associated with the MacDonnell Chieftains, who were a branch of the Scottish Clan Donald.

== Notable people ==
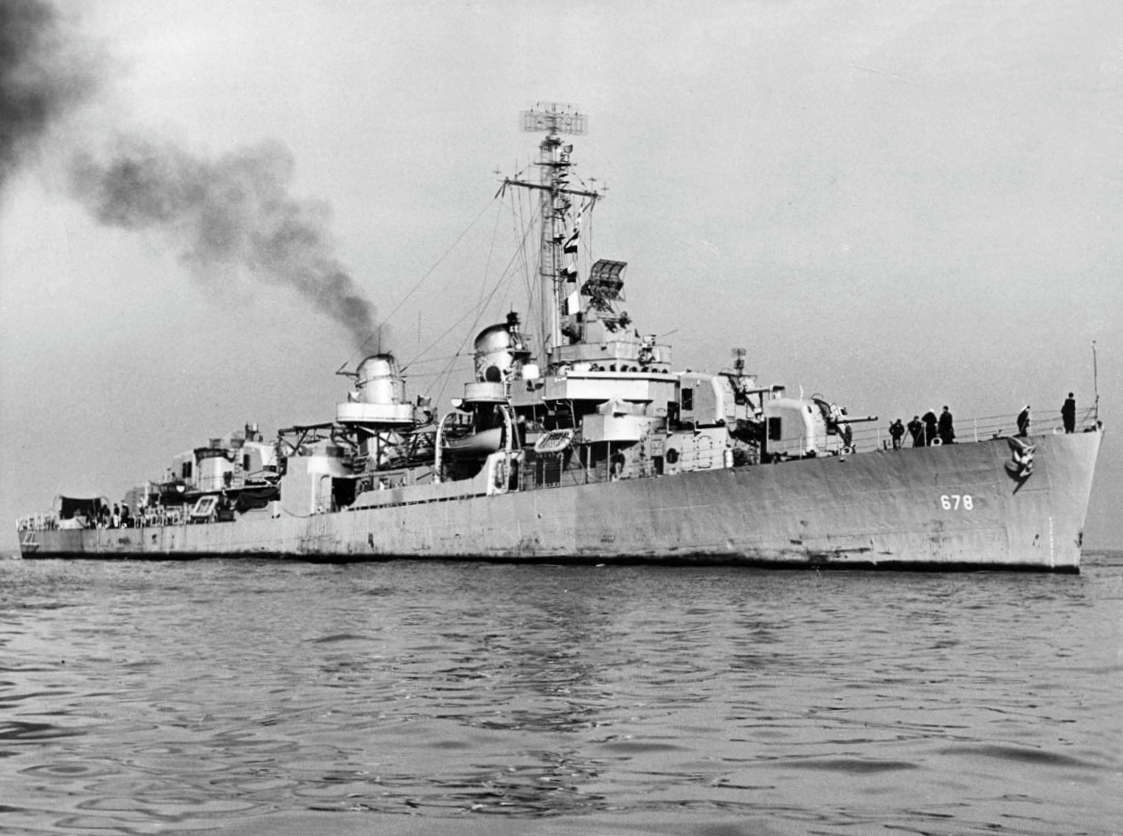
USS McGowan (DD-678), the namesake of Rear Admiral Samuel McGowan USN

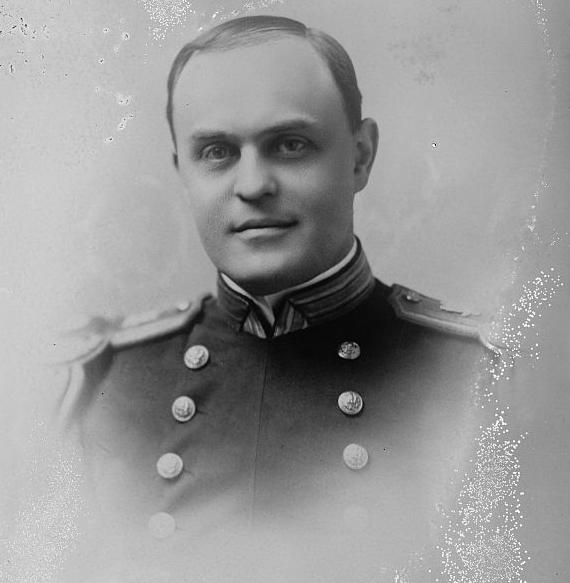
Rear Admiral Samuel McGowan USN

- Alistair McGowan (born 1964), British impressionist
- Andrew McGowan (born 1961), Australian priest and scholar
- Angela McGowan, Australian archeologist
- Archibald C. McGowan (1822–1893), New York politician
- Baron McGowan, the title of four Scottish barons
- Bill McGowan (1896–1954), American baseball umpire
- Brandon McGowan (born 1983), American football player
- Brian McGowan (disambiguation) several people including:

- Brian McGowan (businessman) (born 1945), British co-founder of Williams Holdings
- Brian McGowan (footballer) (1938–2026), Australian rules footballer
- Brian McGowan (politician) (1935–1994), member of the New South Wales Legislative Assembly

- Cathy McGowan (politician) (born 1953), Australian former politician
- Cathy McGowan (presenter) (born 1943), British broadcaster and journalist
- Charles M. McGowan (1923–2013), American businessman and politician
- Daniel G. McGowan (born 1974), American environmental activist prosecuted for domestic terrorism
- Don McGowan (1938–2023), Canadian television personality
- Donald W. McGowan (1899–1967), U.S. Army Major General
- Dustin McGowan (born 1982), North American baseball player
- Dylan McGowan (born 1991), Australian soccer player
- Ed McGowin (born 1938), American visual artist
- Gavin McGowan (born 1976), English footballer
- Gerald S. McGowan (born 1946), United States Ambassador to Portugal, 1998–2001
- J. P. McGowan (1880–1952), Australian-American actor, screenwriter, and director
- James McGowen (1855–1922), Premier of New South Wales 1910–1913
- Jayden McGowan, American college football player 2022–2025
- Jewel McGowan (1921–1962), American dancer
- Joe McGowan (born 1944), Irish historian
- John McGowan (disambiguation), several people, including

- Jack McGowan (playwright) (1894–1977), Broadway writer, performer and producer
- John McGowan (footballer), Scottish footballer
- Jack McGowan (golfer) (1930–2001), American professional golfer
- John McGowan (Medal of Honor) (1831–?), American Civil War sailor and Medal of Honor recipient
- John McGowan (Ontario politician) (1845–1922), Ontario MPP and member of the Canadian House of Commons
- John McGowan (professor) (born 1953), academic at the University of North Carolina, author, editor
- J. P. McGowan John Paterson McGowan (1880–1952), Hollywood actor and director
- John Reid McGowan (1872–1912), Australian boxing champion

- Jonas H. McGowan (1837–1909), US Representative from Michigan
- Kathleen McGowan (born 1963), American novelist
- Keith McGowan (1943–2013), Australian radio presenter
- Kevin McGowan (born 1991), American baseball player
- Kyric McGowan (born 1999), American football player
- LaQuan McGowan (born 1993), American football player
- Margaret M. McGowan (1931–2022), scholar
- Mark McGowan (disambiguation), several people

- Mark McGowan (born 1967), Australian politician and Premier of Western Australia.
- Mark McGowan (Gaelic footballer) (born 1988), Gaelic football player
- Mark McGowan (performance artist) (born 1964), British protester

- Martin McGowan (disambiguation), several people, including

- Martin McGowan (footballer) (born 1962), Scottish footballer
- Martin McGowan (Irish politician) (died 1958), Irish politician and teacher
- Martin J. McGowan, Jr. (1920–2009), American politician and newspaper editor

- Ned McGowan (lawyer) (1812–1892), North American Gold rush pioneer
- Pat McGowan (born 1954), American golfer
- Patrick K. McGowan, American politician
- P. J. McGowan (born 1950s), Irish Gaelic football manager and administrator
- Richard McGowan (1933–2007), American explorer, mountaineer, and entrepreneur
- Robert McGowan (disambiguation), several people, including

- Robert A. McGowan (1901–1955), American screenwriter and director
- Robert F. McGowan (1882–1955), American film director and producer
- Robert Barrington-Ward Robert McGowan Barrington-Ward (1891–1948), journalist
- Robert McGowan Coventry (1855–1914), Scottish painter
- Robert McGowan Dickie (c. 1784 – 1854), Nova Scotia legislator
- Robert McGowan Littlejohn (1890–1982), American major general

- Rose McGowan (born 1973), American actress
- Ross McGowan (born 1982), English golfer
- Ryan McGowan (born 1989), Australian soccer player
- Samuel McGowan (admiral) (1870–1934), admiral in the United States Navy
- Samuel McGowan (general) (1819–1897), Confederate general during the American Civil War
- Samuel Henry McGowan (c. 1844 – 1921), gold mining entrepreneur in Bendigo, Victoria, Australia
- Seth McGowan (born 2001), American football player
- Steve McGowan (disambiguation), several people, including

- Stephen McGowan, chief financial officer of Sun Microsystems
- Stephen McGowan (footballer) (born 1984) Scottish (soccer) footballer
- Stephen McGowan (kidnap victim), South African and British citizen, kidnapped in Mali
- Steve McGowan, English rugby league player

- Taj McGowan (born 1997), American football player
- Tom McGowan (born 1959), American actor
- Thomas F. McGowan (1925–1997), New York politician and judge
- Zach McGowan (born 1980), actor, producer, voice-over artist

MacGowan

- Alice MacGowan (1858–1947), American writer
- Shane MacGowan (1957–2023), Irish musician
- Foster MacGowan Voorhees (1856–1927), American politician, governor of New Jersey

Gowan

- Hunter Gowan John Hunter Gowan II (c. 1727 – 1824), Irish Protestant politician and militiaman
- Lawrence Gowan (born 1956), Canadian musician who used the stage name Gowan
- Ogle Robert Gowan (1803–1876), Canadian-Irish politician, son of Hunter Gowan
- Peter Gowan (1946–2009), UK socialist academic

== Other uses ==
- USS McGowan (DD-678), a US Navy destroyer

== See also ==
- McGowan Lakes, a series of seven small alpine glacial lakes in Custer County, Idaho, United States
- McGowan v. Maryland, a US Supreme Court case involving trading on Sunday
- McGowan's Pass, a topographical feature of Central Park in New York City, New York
- McGowan Station, an island platformed METRORail light rail station in Houston, Texas, United States
- McGowan's War, a bloodless war that took place in Yale, British Columbia in the fall of 1858 and, there, threatened the newly established British authority on the mainland
- McGowan, Washington, a community in Washington state
- McGoohan
- Recipients of the Legion of Merit, awarded to three McGowans
- Distinguished Service Medal (US Army), one McGowan General officer recipient
