= John McGowan =

John McGowan may refer to:

- John McGowan (Medal of Honor) (1831–?), American Civil War sailor and Medal of Honor recipient
- John McGowan (naval officer) (1843–1915), American Civil War veteran and US Navy rear admiral
- John McGowan (playwright) (1894–1977), American Broadway writer, performer and producer
- John McGowan (politician) (1845–1922), Ontario MPP and member of the Canadian House of Commons
- John Reid McGowan (1872–1912), Australian boxing champion
- J. P. McGowan (1880–1952), American Hollywood actor and director
- Jack McGowan (golfer) (1930–2001), American professional golfer
- John McGowan (footballer) (born 1952), Scottish footballer
- John McGowan (professor) (born 1953), American professor of English
- John W. McGowan, member of the New York State Assembly
- Johnny McGowan (1920–2010), Republic of Ireland soccer player
