= Gowan (surname) =

Gowan is an Anglicised Scottish Gaelic-language or Irish-language surname derived from the occupation of smith. Notable people with the surname include:

- Charles Gowan (1850–1938), American and Canadian pioneer and politician
- David Gowan, American politician from Arizona
- Douglas Gowan (1942/43-2018), British PCB pollution researcher
- Franklin B. Gowen (1836–1889), American attorney and president of Reading Railroad
- Geoffrey Gowan (1929–2013), Canadian sports broadcaster
- Hunter Gowan, Irish Protestant politician and militiaman
- J Gowan, defendant in R. v. Gowan, a 1998 Ontario Court of Justice case forbidding women being topless in public for commercial purposes
- James Robert Gowan (1815–1909), Canadian lawyer, judge, and senator
- James Gowan (1923–2015), Scottish architect
- John Curtis Gowan (1912–1986), American psychologist and academic
- Lawrence Gowan (born 1956), Canadian solo musician and member of Styx
- Lee Gowan (born 1961), Canadian novelist
- Ogle Robert Gowan (1803–1876), Canadian-Irish politician
- Peter Gowan (1946–2009), British academic
- Tay Gowan (born 1998), American football player
- William Henry Gowan (1884–1957), American sailor
