= Gowan =

Gowan may refer to:

- Gowan (surname)
- Gowan Jones (born 1989), South African field hockey player
- Gowan Block, built as a commercial building and meeting hall located at 416 Ashmun Street in Sault Ste. Marie, Michigan
- Gowan River, in New Zealand
- River Gowan, Cumbria, a short tributary of the River Kent, England
- Larry Gowan, a Canadian rock vocalist and co-lead vocalist for the band Styx, who also performs under the stage name Gowan

== See also ==
- R. v. Gowan, a 1998 Ontario Court of Justice case forbidding women being topless in public for commercial purposes
- Gowans, a surname
- McGowan, a surname
- Gowon (disambiguation)
