= John Gowan =

John Gowan may refer to:

- John Curtis Gowan (1912–1986), psychologist
- John Hunter Gowan II, Irish loyalist and leader of a yeomanry corps
