= Gowans =

Gowans is a surname, a variant of McGowan, "son of the smith", with the Celtic patronymic prefix 'Mac' replaced by the English patronymic suffix -s. Notable people with the name include:

- Alan Gowans (1923–2001), art historian and academic
- Betty Gowans (born 1947), Canadian sprint canoer
- Brad Gowans (1903–1954), American jazz trombonist and reedist
- Chris Gowans (born 1977), Australian rules football player
- Fred R. Gowans (born 1936), American professor who specializes in the fur trade in the American West
- James Gowans (disambiguation), multiple people, including:
  - James Gowans (architect) (1821–1890), Scottish architect and quarry owner
  - James Gowans (rugby union) (1872–1936), Scottish rugby union player
  - James Learmonth Gowans (born 1924), English immunologist
  - James Gowans (Australian footballer) (born 1977), Australian footballer
- John Gowans (1934–2012), British General of The Salvation Army
- Peter Gowans (1944–2009), Scottish football winger
- Tony Gowans, New Zealand football player
- William Gowans (1803–1870), American bookseller

== See also ==
- Gowan (disambiguation)
- McGowan
