= Jack McGowan =

Jack McGowan may refer to:

- Jack McGowan (playwright) (1894–1977), or John McGowan, American librettist, director and producer
- Jack McGowan (golfer) (1930–2001), John W. "Jack" McGowan, American golfer
- John Reid McGowan (1872–1912), "Gentleman Jack", Australian boxer

== See also ==
- Jack MacGowran (1918–1973), Irish actor
