= FPSB =

FPSB may refer to:

== Economy and Trade ==
- Financial Planning Standards Board, the owner of the Certified Financial Planner mark outside the United States
- Financial Planning Standards Board India, an unrelated Indian public-private enterprise
- First-price sealed-bid auction, a type of auction where bidders submit a bid in a concealed fashion

== Education ==
- Future Problem Solving Program, an international academic competition
