= Gentleman Jack =

Gentleman Jack may refer to:

== People ==
- Legs Diamond (1897–1931), Irish American gangster during the Prohibition era
- Gentleman Jack Gallagher (born 1990), English wrestler
- Anne Lister (1791–1840), English diarist
- John Reid McGowan (1872–1912), Australian boxer
- Jack Purtell (1921–2017), Australian jockey
- Jack Sears (1930–2016), English race and rally driver

== Other uses ==
- Gentleman Jack (TV series), a 2019–22 British-American drama series based on the life of Anne Lister
  - "Gentleman Jack", a 2012 song by O'Hooley & Tidow used as the closing theme for the TV series
- John "Gentleman Jack" Darby, a character from the 1957–62 American TV series Maverick
- Gentleman Jack, a brand of 80 proof whiskey by Jack Daniel's
