= Clan MacGowan =

Clan MacGowan (also MacGowin, MacCowan, McGowan) was an Irish-Scots clan which once occupied the area around the River Nith in Dumfries and Galloway, documented in the 1300s.

== History ==
Clanmacgowin of Stranith was an Irish-Scottish clan recorded in the middle of the 14th century when Donald Edzear acquired the captainship from David II of Scotland. Galloway makes no solid distinction between the names McOwen, McEwen, McKeoune, McCowan, McGowan, etc., all of which can be easily conflated and confused when spoken, and the spellings of which were often not fixed until later in history.

The Irish-Scot clan referred to in 13th century Nithsdale may draw its ancestry from the Irish McGowan Sept, whose eponymous ancestor is Aonghuis Goighne, the legendary ancient King of Ulster. These McGowans came to be a principal Sept in the Irish Kingdom of Ulidia, who were forced to flee their native lands to Donegal, Leitrim, Sligo, Cavan and Scotland as a result of English invasions in the 12th century.

The name McCowan may also refer to a separate eponymous ancestor. McCowan is an old family name from the Kirkconnel area where Robert the Bruce had a company of McCowans in the upper Nith district. The name here may indicate descent from Owen the Bald, king of the Strathclyde Britons, who was killed in 1018.

== See also ==
- McGowan
- McCown
- McCowan baronets
