= Steve McGowan (disambiguation) =

Steve McGowan is a rugby league player.

Steve McGowan may also refer to:

- Stephen McGowan, former chief financial officer of Sun Microsystems
- Stephen McGowan (footballer) (born 1984), Scottish footballer
- Stephen McGowan (kidnap victim), South African and British citizen, kidnapped in Mali
