= Brian McGowan =

Brian McGowan may refer to:

- Brian McGowan (businessman) (born 1945), co-founder of Williams Holdings
- Brian McGowan (footballer) (1938–2026), Australian rules footballer
- Brian McGowan (politician) (1935–1994), former member of the New South Wales Legislative Assembly
