= Ellis Paul Torrance =

American psychologist (1915–2003)

- Born: 8 October 1915; Milledgeville, Georgia, U.S.
- Died: 12 July 2003 (aged 87); Athens, Georgia, U.S.

Academic background
- Education: Mercer University; University of Minnesota; University of Michigan

Academic work
- Main interests: Intelligence and creativity
- Notable ideas: Torrance Tests of Creative Thinking; Threshold hypothesis

Ellis Paul Torrance (October 8, 1915 – July 12, 2003) was an American psychologist best known for his research in creativity.

After completing his undergraduate degree at Mercer University, Torrance acquired a Master's degree at the University of Minnesota and then a doctorate from the University of Michigan. His teaching career spanned from 1957 to 1984. First, he taught at the University of Minnesota and then later at the University of Georgia, where he became professor of Educational Psychology in 1966.

Torrance's major accomplishments include 1,871 publications: 88 books; 256 parts of books or cooperative volumes; 408 journal articles; 538 reports, manuals, tests, etc.; 162 articles in popular journals or magazines; 355 conference papers; and 64 forewords or prefaces. He also created the Future Problem Solving Program International, the Incubation Curriculum Model, and the Torrance Tests of Creative Thinking.

== Threshold hypothesis ==
There has been debate in the psychological literature about whether intelligence and creativity are part of the same process (the conjoint hypothesis) or represent distinct mental processes (the disjoint hypothesis).

Analysis of correlations between intelligence and creativity from the 1950s onwards, by authors such as Barron, Guilford or Wallach and Kogan, regularly suggested that correlations between these concepts were low enough to justify treating them as distinct concepts. Some researchers believe that creativity is the outcome of the same cognitive processes as intelligence, and that it is only judged as creativity in terms of its consequences, i.e.: when the outcome of cognitive processes happens to produce something novel, a view which Perkins has termed the "nothing special" hypothesis.

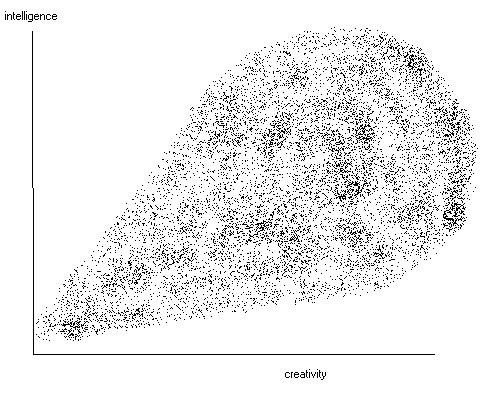
The threshold hypothesis

The "threshold hypothesis", proposed by Torrance, holds that, in a general sample, there will be a positive correlation between low creativity and intelligence scores, but a correlation will not be found with higher scores. Research into the threshold hypothesis, however, has produced mixed results.

=== Legacy ===
For his "...outstanding contributions in support of the areas concerned with the art and science of human movement," Torrance was inducted as an Associate Fellow in the prestigious American Academy of Physical Education (now known as the National Academy of Kinesiology) in 1981, though he may have been elected into the Academy in 1980. In 1984, the University of Georgia established the Torrance Center for Creativity and Talent Development.

A special issue of Creativity Research Journal (guest edited by James C. Kaufman and John Baer) was dedicated to his honor and memory. The National Association for Gifted Children has designated a special lecture dedicated to Torrance in one of its focus interest groups.

In 2015 in Istanbul, Turkey, the KIE Conference launched the annual E. Paul Torrance International Roundtable on Creative Thinking, to refresh the work and legacy of Dr Torrance internationally especially among today’s crop of creativity enthusiasts, push the boundary of knowledge on creative thinking as well as increase knowledge sharing within creativity field. Torrance roundtable has been held in Istanbul, Turkey, Berlin, Germany, Philadelphia, USA, Prague, Czech Republic, Dubai, UAE, Virtual/Online, etc.

In 2019, the KIE annual creativity volume, was dedicated to Dr Torrance's 105th anniversary of his birth: Marking the 105 Birthday of the contemporary Father of Modern Creativity: E. Paul Torrance.

The Torrance newsletter is published annually and dedicated to Torrance.

== See also ==
- Creative Education Foundation
- John Curtis Gowan

== Sources ==
- Torrance, E. P. (1974). Torrance Tests of Creative Thinking. Scholastic Testing Service, Inc.
- Millar, G. W. (2007). E. Paul Torrance, "The Creativity Man" : an Authorized Biography. Ablex Publishing Corporation. ISBN 978-1-56750-165-0.
