= Torrance Tests of Creative Thinking =

Creativity test

The Torrance Tests of Creative Thinking, formerly the Minnesota Tests of Creative Thinking, is a test of creativity built on J. P. Guilford's work and created by Ellis Paul Torrance. The Torrance Tests originally involved simple tests of divergent thinking and other problem-solving skills, which were scored on four scales:

- Fluency - the total number of interpretable, meaningful, and relevant ideas generated in response to the stimulus,
- Flexibility - the number of different categories of relevant responses,
- Originality - the statistical rarity of the responses, and
- Elaboration - the amount of detail in the responses.

== History ==
In 1976, Arasteh and Arasteh wrote that the most systematic assessment of creativity in elementary school children has been conducted by Torrance and his associates (1960a, 1960b, 1960c, 1961, 1962, 1962a, 1963a, and 1964) with the Minnesota Tests of Creative Thinking, which was later renamed the Torrance Tests of Creative Thinking, with several thousands of schoolchildren. The Minnesota group, in contrast to Guilford, has devised scoring tasks involving both verbal and non-verbal aspects and relying on senses other than vision. They also differ from the battery developed by Wallach and Kogan (1965), which contains measures representing "creative tendencies" that are similar in nature.

Several longitudinal studies have been conducted to follow up on the elementary school-aged students who were first administered the Torrance Tests in 1958 in Minnesota. There was a 22-year follow-up, a 40-year follow-up, and a 50-year follow-up.

Torrance (1962) grouped the different subtests of the Minnesota Tests of Creative Thinking into three categories:

1. Verbal tasks using verbal stimuli
2. Verbal tasks using non-verbal stimuli
3. Non-verbal task

The third edition of the Torrance Tests of Creative Thinking in 1984 removed the "flexibility" scale from the figural test but added "resistance to premature closure" (based on Gestalt psychology) and "abstractness of titles" as two new criterion-referenced scores on the figural. Torrance called the new scoring procedure Streamlined Scoring. With the five norm-referenced measures that he had (fluency, originality, abstractness of titles, elaboration, and resistance to premature closure), he added 13 criterion-referenced measures that include: emotional expressiveness, story-telling articulateness, movement or actions, expressiveness of titles, syntheses of incomplete figures, synthesis of lines and of circles, unusual visualization, extending or breaking boundaries, humor, richness of imagery, colourfulness of imagery, and fantasy.

== Tasks ==
A brief description of the tasks used by Torrance is given below:

=== Verbal tasks using verbal stimuli ===
Unusual uses
The unusual uses tasks using verbal stimuli are direct modifications of Guilford's Brick uses test. After preliminary tryouts, Torrance (1962) decided to substitute tin cans and books for bricks. It was believed the children would be able to handle tin cans and books more easily since both are more available to children than bricks.

Impossibilities task
It was used originally by Guilford and his associates (1951) as a measure of fluency involving complex restrictions and large potential. In a course in personality development and mental hygiene, Torrance has experimented with a number of modifications of the basic task, making the restrictions more specific. In this task the subjects are asked to list as many impossibilities as they can.

Consequences task
The consequences task was also used originally by Guilford and his associates (1951). Torrance has made several modifications in adapting it. He chose three improbable situations and the children were required to list out their consequences.

Just suppose task
It is an adaptation of the consequences type of test designed to elicit a higher degree of spontaneity and to be more effective with children. As in the consequence task, the subject is confronted with an improbable situation and asked to predict the possible outcomes from the introduction of a new or unknown variable.

Situations task
The situation task was modeled after Guilford's (1951) test designed to assess the ability to see what needs to be done. Subjects were given three common problems and asked to think of as many solutions to these problems as they can. For example, if all schools were abolished, what would you do to try to become educated?

Common problems task
This task is an adoption of Guilford's (1951) Test designed to assess the ability to see defects, needs and deficiencies and found to be one of the tests of the factors termed sensitivity to problems. Subjects are instructed that they will be given common situations and that they will be asked to think of as many problems as they can that may arise in connection with these situations. For example, doing homework while going to school in the morning.

Improvement task
This test was adopted from Guilford's (1952) apparatus test, which was designed to assess the ability to see defects and all aspects of sensitivity to problems. The subjects are given a list of common objects and are asked to suggest as many ways as they can to improve each object, not concerning whether or not it is possible to implement the change.

Mother-Hubbard problem
This task was conceived as an adoption of the situational task for oral administration in the primary grades and for older groups. This test concerns the development of ideas. The task asks children how they would solve the problem of Old Mother Hubbard going to the cupboard to get her dog a bone but finding it empty.

Imaginative stories task
The child is told to write the most interesting and exciting story they can think of. Topics are suggested (e.g., the dog that did not bark); or the child may use their own ideas.

Cow jumping problems
The cow jumping problem is a companion task for the Mother-Hubbard problem and has been administered to the same groups under the same conditions and scored according to the similar procedures. The task is to think of all possible things which might have happened when the cow jumped over the Moon.

=== Verbal tasks using nonverbal stimuli ===
Ask and guess task
The ask and guess task requires the individual first to ask questions about a picture – questions which cannot be answered by just looking at the picture. Next they are asked to make guesses or formulate hypotheses about the possible causes of the event depicted, and then their consequences both immediate and remote.

Product improvement task
In this task common toys are used and children are asked to think of as many improvements as they can which would make the toy ‘more fun to play with’. Subjects are then asked to think of unusual uses of these toys other than 'something to play with’.

Unusual uses task
In this task, along with the product improvement task another task (unusual uses) is used. The child is asked to think of the cleverest, most interesting and most unusual uses of the given toy, other than as a plaything. These uses could be for the toy as it is, or for the toy as changed.

=== Non-verbal tasks (figural) ===
Incomplete figures task
It is an adaptation of the ‘Drawing completion test’ developed by Kate Franck and used by Barron (1958). On an ordinary white paper an area of fifty four square inches is divided into ten squares each containing a different stimulus figure. The subjects are asked to sketch some novel objects or design by adding as many lines as they can to the ten figures.

Picture construction task or shapes task
In this task the children are given shape of a triangle or a jelly bean and a sheet of white paper. The children are asked to think of a picture in which the given shape is an integral part. They should paste it wherever they want on the white sheet and add lines with pencil to make any novel picture. They have to think of a name for the picture and write it at the bottom.

Circles and squares task
It was originally designed as a nonverbal test of ideational fluency and flexibility, then modified in such a way as to stress originality and elaboration. Two printed forms are used in the test. In one form, the subject is confronted with a page of forty two circles and asked to sketch objects or pictures which have circles as a major part. In the alternate form, squares are used instead of circles.

Creative design task
Hendrickson has designed it which seems to be promising, but scoring procedures are being tested but have not been perfected yet. The materials consist of circles and strips of various sizes and colours, a four-page booklet, scissors and glue. Subjects are instructed to construct pictures or designs, making use of all of the coloured circles and strips with a thirty-minute time limit. Subjects may use one, two, three, or four pages; alter the circles and strips or use them as they are; add other symbols with pencil or crayon.

== See also ==
- Creativity
