= Rick Nolan =

American politician (1943–2024)

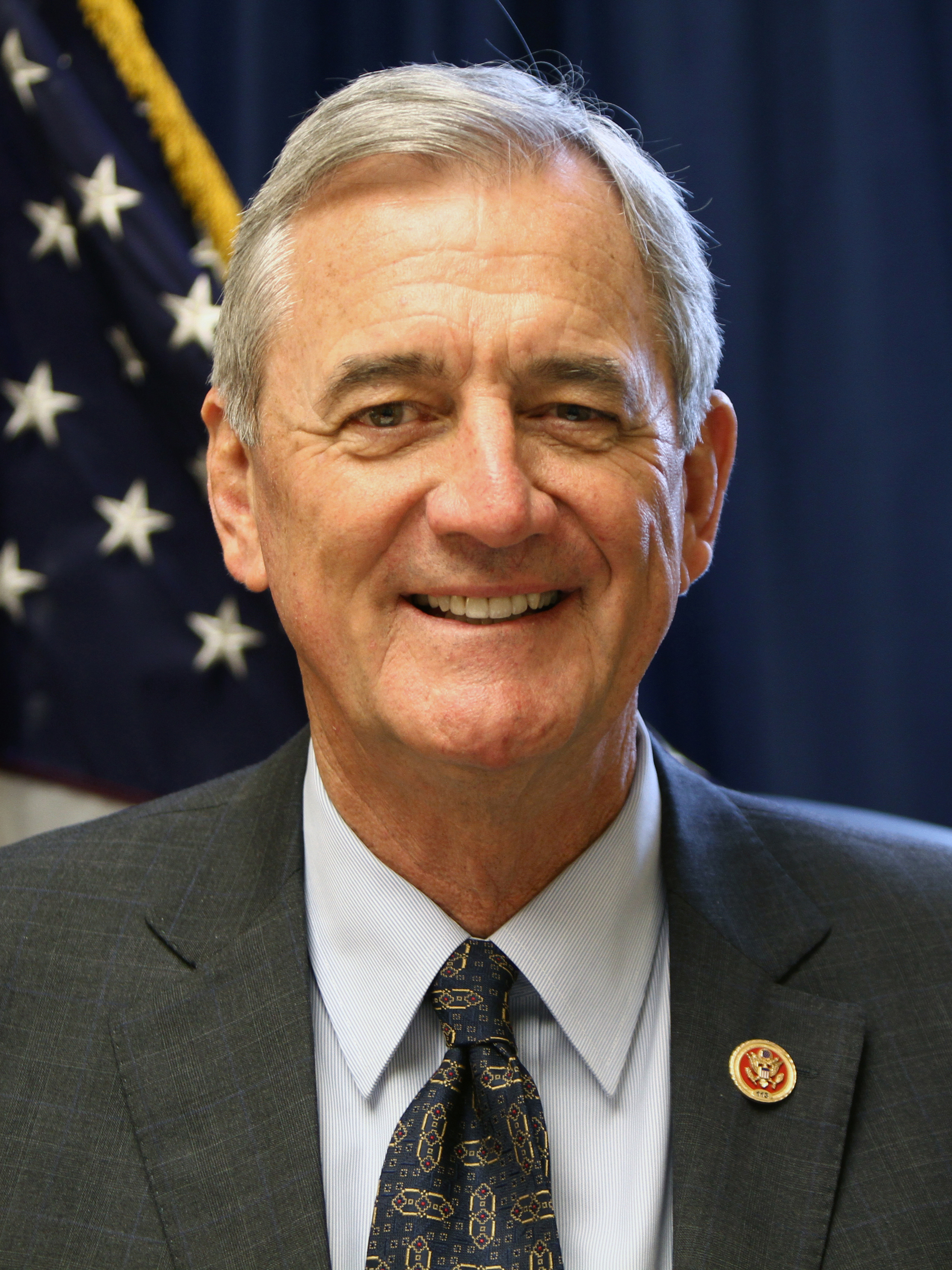

Member of the U.S. House of Representatives from Minnesota
- In office January 3, 2013 – January 3, 2019
- Preceded by: Chip Cravaack
- Succeeded by: Pete Stauber
- Constituency: 8th district
- In office January 3, 1975 – January 3, 1981
- Preceded by: John M. Zwach
- Succeeded by: Vin Weber
- Constituency: 6th district

Member of the Minnesota House of Representatives from the 53A district
- In office January 7, 1969 – January 1, 1973
- Preceded by: John Lemme
- Succeeded by: Raymond Kempe

Personal details
- Born: Richard Michael Nolan; December 17, 1943 Brainerd, Minnesota, U.S.
- Died: October 18, 2024 (aged 80) (Note: Nolan's date of death has been given as October 18, 2024, by multiple sources, including the website for the funeral home handling his memorial service. Some other sources have given his date of death as October 17.) Nisswa, Minnesota, U.S.
- Party: Democratic
- Spouses: Marjorie C. Langer (m. 1964; div. 1982); Mary L. Wieland (m. 1984)
- Children: 4
- Relatives: Martin J. McGowan Jr. (uncle)
- Education: University of Minnesota (BA)
- Website: House website (archived)

Richard Michael Nolan (December 17, 1943 – October 18, 2024) was an American politician and businessman who served as the U.S. representative from Minnesota's 8th congressional district from 2013 to 2019. He previously served as the U.S. representative from Minnesota's 6th congressional district between 1975 and 1981 and was also a member of the Minnesota House of Representatives from 1969 until 1973.

After re-entering politics in 2011, he was nominated to challenge first-term incumbent Republican Chip Cravaack in the 8th district, defeating him on November 6, 2012. Nolan was re-elected in 2014 and 2016.

Nolan's 32-year gap between terms in Congress is the second-longest such break in service (after Philip Francis Thomas's 34-year gap from 1841 to 1875) in American political history. On February 9, 2018, Nolan announced he would retire from Congress at the end of his current term. Nolan ran for Lieutenant Governor of Minnesota as the running mate of Attorney General of Minnesota Lori Swanson in the 2018 gubernatorial election. They were defeated in the August primary by Tim Walz and Peggy Flanagan.

== Early life and education ==
Nolan was born in Brainerd, Minnesota, and graduated from Brainerd High School in 1962. His aunt was an attorney and judge, whom Nolan called his "biggest political influence growing up." He attended St. John's University in Collegeville, Minnesota, the following year, and completed his undergraduate studies at the University of Minnesota, earning his Bachelor of Arts in 1966. He was enrolled in the Army ROTC program for two years, from 1962 to 1964. Nolan pursued postgraduate work in public administration and policy formation at the University of Maryland, College Park, and in education at St. Cloud State University.

== Early political career ==
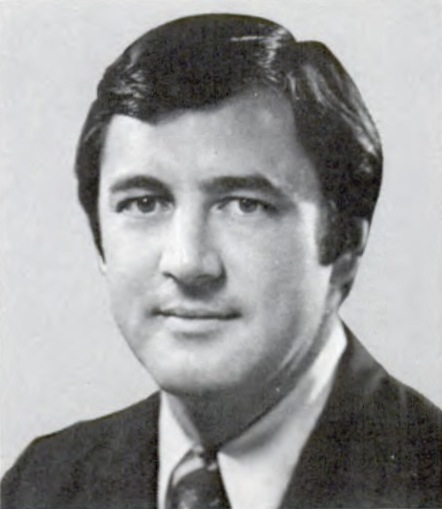
Nolan during his first stint in Congress in the 1970s

Early in his career he served as a staff assistant to Walter Mondale in the United States Senate, and was a teacher of social studies in Royalton, Minnesota. In 1968, he campaigned for presidential candidate Eugene McCarthy.

Nolan was elected to the Minnesota House of Representatives in 1968 and served two terms (1969–1973), representing House District 53A (Morrison County). His uncle Martin J. McGowan Jr. also served in the Minnesota Legislature.

=== First tenure in Congress ===
He then ran unsuccessfully for Minnesota's 6th congressional district seat in the United States House of Representatives in 1972, but was elected in his second run in 1974 to the 94th Congress and reelected to the 95th and the 96th.

In 1979, he broke with his party in endorsing Senator Ted Kennedy for president over the sitting Democratic President Jimmy Carter.

In 2007, he endorsed Connecticut Senator Christopher Dodd in his campaign for President of the United States, and traveled the state of Iowa campaigning on his behalf.

== Business career ==
Nolan decided not to run for reelection in 1980, and served as president of the U.S. Export Corporation until 1986, and was later appointed to and became president of the Minnesota World Trade Center, a private-public initiative, by then-Democratic Party chairman Governor Rudy Perpich from 1987 to 1994. The National Journal reported that "his Republican foes criticized his $70,000 salary, which they considered high for a civil servant at the time, and the budget deficits the company ran up." He has also served as chairman of the Mission Township Planning Committee, president and board member of the Central Lakes College foundation, to which he helped direct federal funding. Nolan is the former owner of Emily Wood Products, a small sawmill and pallet factory in the northern Minnesota community of Emily. His daughter and son-in-law now own and operate the enterprise.

== Return to Congress ==
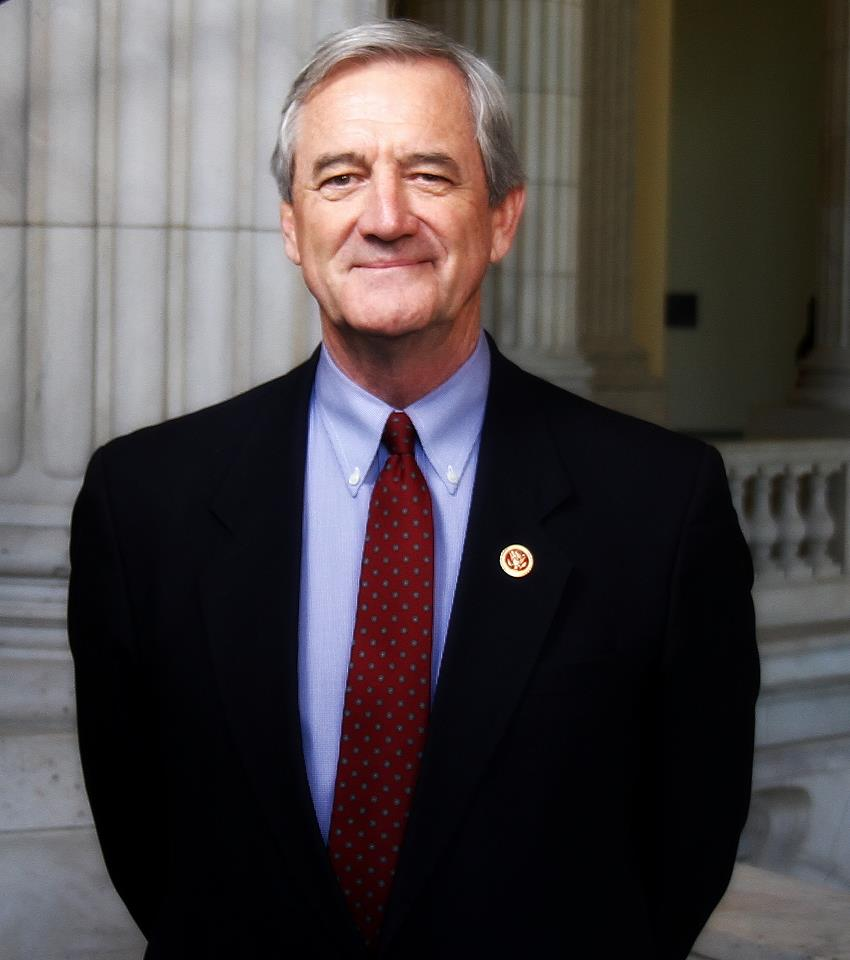
Nolan's first official photo since returning to Congress

=== U.S. Congress campaigns ===
2012

Nolan announced his candidacy for the U.S. House of Representatives on July 12, 2011, challenging incumbent Chip Cravaack in Minnesota's 8th congressional district. He won the Democratic primary in August 2012, defeating Tarryl Clark and Jeff Anderson. The Democratic Congressional Campaign Committee spent about $2 million on his campaign, and the liberal House Majority PAC spent another $1.5 million. Nolan defeated Cravaack, 54% to 45%, to return to Congress after a 32-year absence.

2014

Nolan ran for re-election in 2014. The Democratic primary took place on August 12, 2014, and the general election on November 4, 2014. He was challenged by Republican nominee Stewart Mills III. According to Politico, Nolan was a vulnerable Democrat in a competitive congressional district. He was targeted by Americans for Prosperity over his support of the Affordable Care Act. He was successful in his close re-election bid, defeating Mills 49% to 47%.

2016

Nolan faced Mills in a rematch and narrowly defeated him again, 50.2% to 49.6%. Nolan greatly outran the top of the Democratic ticket, as Hillary Clinton became the first Democratic presidential nominee to lose the 8th district since before the Great Depression. Republican Donald Trump won the 8th district by a margin of 16%, but despite this, Nolan managed to survive and win re-election.

=== Issues ===
==== Gun policy ====
Nolan said that he supported the Second Amendment but believed there should be some restrictions on gun ownership. In January 2013, Rick Nolan called the assault weapon ban, which expired in 2004, common sense legislation, saying he didn't need an assault weapon to kill a duck.

==== Energy and environment ====
Nolan voiced opposition to the proposed route of the Enbridge Sandpiper pipeline, saying it posed environmental risks to vulnerable wetlands and drinking water in northern Minnesota.

Nolan voted against an amendment requiring a study of the vulnerabilities of the Keystone XL pipeline to a terrorist attack and certification that necessary protections have been put in place.

Nolan supported increased federal investment in the mining industry, including a "$250 million-a-year research center that would look at newer, cheaper and more environmentally friendly ways of extracting resources from the region." He also advocated for speeding up the environmental review process for mining companies.

==== Economic issues ====
During a debate in 2012, Nolan said that taxes should be raised and that provisions in the tax code that encourage offshoring should be eliminated. Nolan also said that the "super-rich" in particular should be targeted for tax increases.

Nolan voiced support for the stimulus spending championed by President Obama. He said, "It did in fact create good jobs in a whole wide range of areas, not the least of which is in the field of transportation."

On October 1, 2013, Nolan introduced a bill that would withhold the pay of members of Congress during a government shutdown, in response to the shutdown that had gone into effect that morning. "It's time for Congress to start living in the real world – where you either do your job, or you don't get paid," he said concerning the bill.

==== Health care ====
In June 2014, Nolan and Republican David McKinley introduced the Health Care Fairness and Flexibility Act, which would delay an Affordable Care Act fee on every person covered by large self-insured employers and insurance companies. According to the Duluth News Tribune, "The effort marks a rare bit of bipartisan cooperation in Washington when it comes to legislation, especially regarding the president's signature law."

Nolan supported the Affordable Care Act and said he would not vote to repeal it. Nolan said, "It ensures that another 30 million people in this country would have health insurance; it provides that nobody can be denied as a result of preconditions; it provides that parents can keep their children insured up to the age of 26."

Nolan was a strong supporter of single-payer health care and believed it should be the ultimate goal of the Affordable Care Act.

==== Foreign policy ====
Nolan was one of four members of Congress to vote against the 2014 Veterans Affairs appropriations bill. The bill allocated $73.3 billion to veterans programs and military construction projects, "$1.4 billion more than what Congress budgeted last year." In a statement, Nolan said, "I voted against the bill in protest, because it under-funds veterans health and benefit programs, while shoveling billions of new dollars into unnecessary new military construction in places all around the world where American presence and American resources do not belong."

In 2014, Nolan urged President Obama to resist further military intervention in both Syria and Iraq.

Nolan visited Cuba along with President Barack Obama in March 2016. It was a return trip for Nolan, who had first been to Cuba in 1977.

==== Abortion ====
Nolan voted against the Pain-Capable Unborn Child Protection Act, which prohibits abortions after 20 weeks.

==== Campaign finance ====
Nolan supported campaign finance reform. In February 2013, Nolan introduced a constitutional amendment designed to overturn the Supreme Court's decision in the Citizens United v. FEC case that dealt with the regulation of campaign spending by organizations. In 2015, Nolan joined Democratic U.S. Representatives Keith Ellison, Mark Pocan, Matt Cartwright, Jared Huffman and Raúl Grijalva as co-sponsors of legislation calling for a constitutional amendment to overturn the U.S. Supreme Court's 2010 Citizens United decision.

=== Congressional tenure ===
Nolan sat on the Transportation and Infrastructure Committee, and four of its Subcommittees: Highways and Transit; Aviation; Economic Development, Public Buildings and Emergency Management; and Water Resources and the Environment. He also serves on the House Agriculture Committee and two of its Subcommittees: Conservation, Energy and Forestry, and Livestock, Rural Development, and Credit.

Nolan had previously served on the House Small Business Committee and the House Agriculture Committee; his previous appointments would have earned him some Committee Seniority on these committees that he had already served on in the 94th, 95th and 96th Congresses. Instead, Nolan will now have Committee Seniority on only the House Agriculture Committee and be a junior member of the Transportation and Infrastructure Committee.

Nolan had been quoted as saying he would like to serve on "the Transportation and Infrastructure Committee, along with the Natural Resources Committee, which hears legislation that directly affects the mining, forestry, agriculture and tourism-based economy of the Eighth Congressional District."

Nolan and Minnesota Senator Amy Klobuchar were the original co-sponsors of legislation called the Small Airplane Revitalization Act of 2013, a bill that would modernize small aircraft regulations and the FAA's Part 23 certification process.

Nolan endorsed Bernie Sanders in the 2016 Democratic U.S. presidential primary election.

He was a member of the Congressional Progressive Caucus, the Climate Solutions Caucus, the Congressional Arts Caucus, and the United States Congressional International Conservation Caucus.

==== Legislation sponsored ====
The following is an incomplete list of legislation that Nolan sponsored:

- Affordable College Textbook Act (H.R. 3840; 115th Congress)

=== 2018 campaign for lieutenant governor ===
In 2018, Lori Swanson declared her candidacy for governor, and selected Nolan as her running mate. In the August primary, Swanson and Nolan were defeated by the ticket of Tim Walz and Peggy Flanagan.

== Personal life and death ==
Nolan first married Marjorie C. Langer on June 13, 1964. They had four children. After they divorced on April 15, 1982, he then married Mary L. Wieland on May 19, 1984. His daughter, Katherine Nolan Bensen, died on September 15, 2020, at the age of 46, after a five-year battle with small-cell carcinoma.

On October 18, 2024, it was announced that Nolan died from a heart condition at his home in Nisswa, Minnesota, at the age of 80.

== Electoral history ==
2016

Minnesota's 8th Congressional district election, 2016
| Party | Candidate | Votes | % |
|---|---|---|---|
| Democratic (DFL) | Rick Nolan (Incumbent) | 179,093 | 50.17 |
| Republican | Stewart Mills III | 177,089 | 49.61 |
| | Write-in | 792 | 0.22 |
| Majority | | 2,004 | 0.56 |
| Total votes | | 356,974 | 100.0 |
| Democratic (DFL) hold | | | |

2014

Minnesota's 8th Congressional district election, 2014
| Party | Candidate | Votes | % |
|---|---|---|---|
| Democratic (DFL) | Rick Nolan (Incumbent) | 129,090 | 48.51 |
| Republican | Stewart Mills III | 125,358 | 47.11 |
| Green | Skip Sandman | 11,450 | 4.30 |
| | Write-in | 185 | 0.07 |
| Majority | | 3,732 | 1.40 |
| Total votes | | 266,083 | 100.0 |
| Democratic (DFL) hold | | | |

2012

Minnesota's 8th Congressional district election, 2012
| Party | Candidate | Votes | % |
|---|---|---|---|
| Democratic (DFL) | Rick Nolan | 191,976 | 54.28 |
| Republican | Chip Cravaack (incumbent) | 160,520 | 45.39 |
| | Write-in | 1,167 | 0.33 |
| Majority | | 31,456 | 8.89 |
| Total votes | | 353,663 | 100.0 |
| Democratic (DFL) gain from Republican | | | |

1978

Minnesota's 6th Congressional district election, 1978
| Party | Candidate | Votes | % |
|---|---|---|---|
| Democratic (DFL) | Rick Nolan (Incumbent) | 115,880 | 55.28 |
| Independent-Republican | Russ Bjorhus | 93,742 | 44.72 |
| | Write-in | NDA | NDA |
| Majority | | 22,138 | 10.56 |
| Total votes | | 209,622 | 100.0 |
| Democratic (DFL) hold | | | |

1976

Minnesota's 6th Congressional district election, 1976
| Party | Candidate | Votes | % |
|---|---|---|---|
| Democratic (DFL) | Rick Nolan (Incumbent) | 147,507 | 59.79 |
| Independent-Republican | James (Jim) Anderson | 99,201 | 40.21 |
| | Write-in | NDA | NDA |
| Majority | | 48,306 | 19.58 |
| Total votes | | 246,708 | 100.0 |
| Democratic (DFL) hold | | | |

1974

Minnesota's 6th Congressional district election, 1974
| Party | Candidate | Votes | % |
|---|---|---|---|
| Democratic (DFL) | Rick Nolan | 96,465 | 55.36 |
| Republican | Jon Grunseth | 77,797 | 44.64 |
| | Write-in | 1 | 0.00 |
| Majority | | 18,668 | 10.71 |
| Total votes | | 174,263 | 100.0 |
| Democratic (DFL) gain from Republican | | | |

1972

Minnesota's 6th Congressional district election, 1972
| Party | Candidate | Votes | % |
|---|---|---|---|
| Republican | John Zwach (incumbent) | 114,537 | 51.02 |
| Democratic (DFL) | Rick Nolan | 109,955 | 48.98 |
| | Write-in | NDA | NDA |
| Majority | | 4,582 | 2.04 |
| Total votes | | 224,492 | 100.0 |
| Republican hold | | | |

== See also ==
- List of United States representatives from Minnesota
- Minnesota's congressional delegations

== Notes ==
U.S. House of Representatives
| Preceded by John Zwach | Member of the U.S. House of Representatives from Minnesota's 6th congressional district 1975–1981 | Succeeded by Vin Weber |
| Preceded by Chip Cravaack | Member of the U.S. House of Representatives from Minnesota's 8th congressional district 2013–2019 | Succeeded by Pete Stauber |
