= Chip Cravaack =

American educator and politician (born 1959)

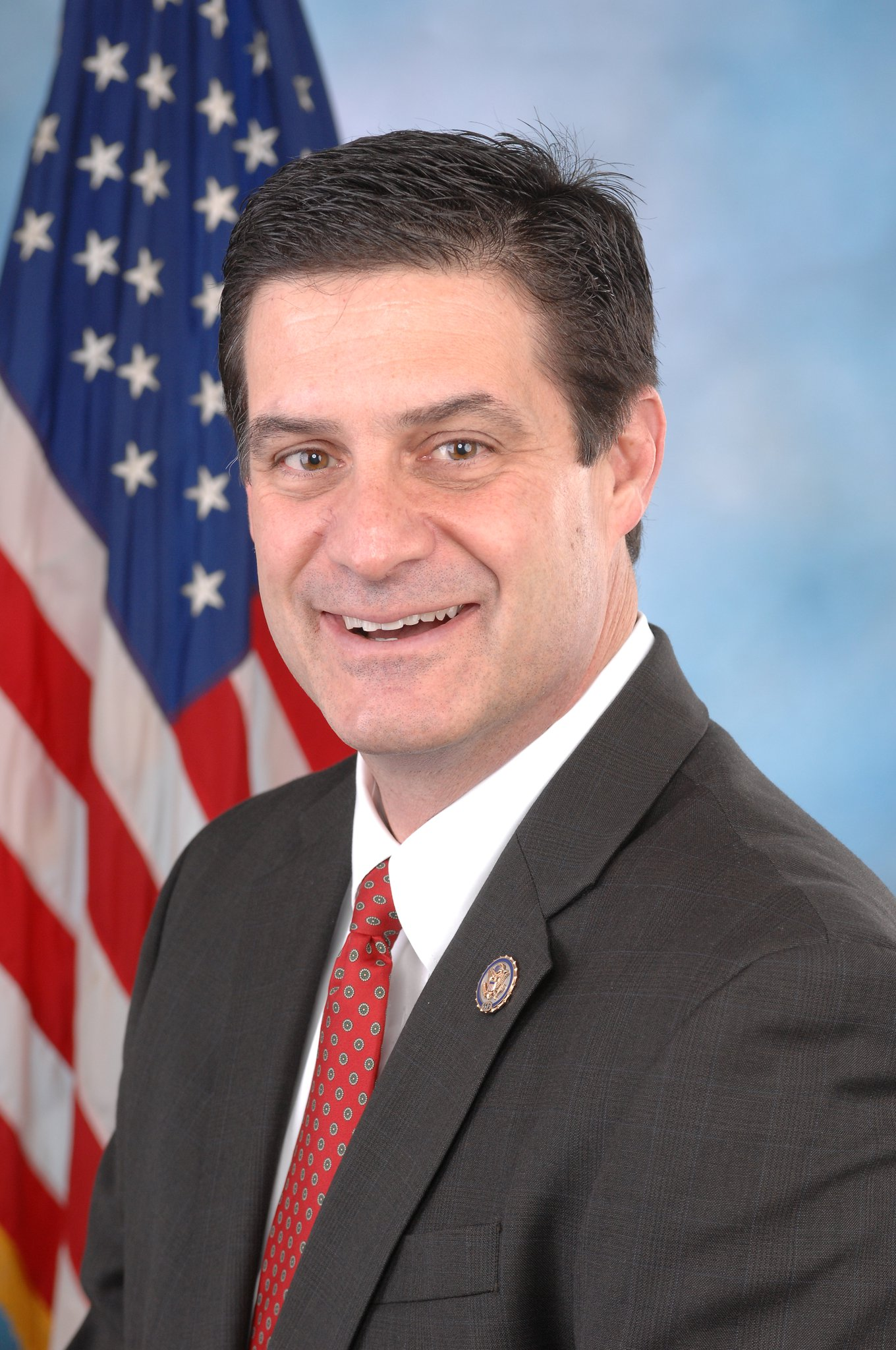
- Official portrait, 2011

Member of the U.S. House of Representatives from Minnesota's 8th district
- In office January 3, 2011 – January 3, 2013
- Preceded by: Jim Oberstar
- Succeeded by: Rick Nolan

Personal details
- Born: Raymond John Cravaack; January 29, 1959 (age 67) Charleston, West Virginia, U.S.
- Party: Republican
- Spouse(s): Jill Jurgensen (m. 1984; div. 1988) Traci Rae Gordon (m. 1993; div. 2011)
- Children: 2
- Education: United States Naval Academy (BS); University of West Florida (MEd)

Military service
- Branch/service: United States Navy
- Years of service: 1981–1990 (acting); 1990–2005 (reserve)
- Rank: Captain

Raymond John "Chip" Cravaack (born January 29, 1959) (Note: Cravaack was born in 1959. Multiple sources, including the Biographical Directory of the United States Congress, list his birth date as December 29. However, at least one other source says he was born on January 29, and several articles about his 2010 congressional campaign, all published before December 29, give his age as 51, which would support the earlier birthday.) is an American former politician and aviator. He was a Republican member of the United States House of Representatives for northeastern Minnesota's 8th congressional district from 2011 to 2013. In his first run for political office, he upset 18-term Democratic incumbent Jim Oberstar by a margin of 4,400 votes to become the first Republican since 1947 to represent the district. Previously, Cravaack was a pilot for Northwest Airlines, and before that, he was a Navy pilot and a graduate of the U.S. Naval Academy. He was defeated by DFL nominee Rick Nolan on November 6, 2012.

== Early life and education ==
Cravaack was born in 1959 in Charleston, West Virginia. His ancestry includes German, Italian, and Romanian-German. He grew up in the Cincinnati suburb of Madeira, Ohio, the eldest of three children in a Republican family that had a military background; his father, Ray, served in the Korean War, and his grandfather served in World War I, as a motorcycle dispatch rider. Cravaack graduated from St. Xavier High School in 1977. He graduated from the United States Naval Academy in 1981 with a bachelor of science degree and a Master's of Education from the University of West Florida in 1989.

== Military service ==
Following graduation, Cravaack served in the Navy as a helicopter pilot, fulfilling a childhood ambition. While in the Navy serving as a Flight Instructor in Pensacola Florida, he earned a Master of Education from the University of West Florida. After his release from active duty, he served in the Naval Reserve, serving with aircraft carrier crew augmentation units, the Navy Command Center at the Pentagon, CINCPAC Fleet in Hawaii, and ended his career serving with NATO, Supreme Allied Atlantic. Cravaack retired in 2005 with the rank of Captain.

== Northwest Airlines career ==
Cravaack moved to Minnesota and began working as a pilot for Northwest Airlines in 1990. He was out of work for two years in the early 1990s due to layoffs, during which time he became a simulator instructor for a subsidiary of Northwest Airlines teaching foreign pilots.

He was a union steward for the Airline Pilots Association. He served as a "strike coordinator" during the 1998 pilots' strike, bringing military discipline and parade-ground style marching to the picket lines.

Cravaack moved to New Hampshire after Congress to be with his sons, where he spent the last eight years before retirement as a teacher at Bishop Guertin High School, teaching U.S. History, Economics, and U.S. Government.

He is now retired and shuttles between the Winnipesaukee area in New Hampshire and the cradle of Naval Aviation, Pensacola, Florida.

== United States Representative ==
=== 2010 Election bid ===
Cravaack was inspired to run for Congress by a suggestion from a talk radio show host that voters demand town hall meetings with their congressmen during the health care bill Tea Party movement protests of August 2009. Cravaack went with 25 people to one of Oberstar's Minnesota offices asking for a meeting that day and when Oberstar did not come, Cravaack decided to challenge him in the November 2010 election.

Cravaack entered the race as a political novice and an underdog. The 8th had been in Democratic hands since 1947, and Oberstar was the longest-serving congressman in Minnesota's history, usually cruising to reelection. Geography also seemed to be against Cravaack; his home in Lindstrom was in Chisago County, in the southern portion of the district. His campaign manager was future Minnesota House of Representatives member Anne Neu.

According to the Star Tribune, Cravaack's campaign was "structured like a military operation". He toured the district in a motor home dubbed "The War Wagon," and gave volunteers ranks such as commander, captain, and precinct lieutenant. He discovered that his experience as a union steward attracted the interest of district voters, especially the miners.

Cravaack campaigned on a platform of free-market principles and government spending cuts. He attacked Oberstar's vote on the health care bill, saying he would vote to repeal and replace it, and called an Oberstar-approved extension of the Clean Water Act to include wet meadows a "land grab" by the federal government. Cravaack also criticized the earmark process that Oberstar had used to fund infrastructure projects in the district, saying it was time for the spending to stop, and attacked Oberstar's vote on "cap and trade" legislation to limit carbon emissions, saying it would result in higher energy prices. In his first ad, Cravaack paid homage to Oberstar's service, saying that he ran against Oberstar "with all due respect" but accusing him of having lost touch with the district.

The crowd jeered Oberstar at a candidate debate held in Duluth, and he called for a more civil atmosphere at the next debate. The second debate centered on economic issues. Cravaack argued that the 2003 Bush tax cuts should be continued in all tax brackets to stimulate employment, and Oberstar said he would end the tax cut for the top two percent of earners because the lowered tax had caused part of the deficit.

A poll conducted for KSTP-TV in the Twin Cities in October showed Oberstar ahead of Cravaack by only one point, 47% to 46%. Cravaack received the endorsement of former Speaker of the House Newt Gingrich as the polls tightened. He was also endorsed by Minnesota's largest anti-abortion organization, Minnesota Citizens Concerned for Life, and the largest newspaper in the district, the Duluth News Tribune. In the November 2 election, Cravaack scored one of the biggest upsets in Minnesota political history, unseating Oberstar by 4,399 votes. He believed the abortion issue was crucial to his victory; he had argued that Obamacare allowed for the payment of abortions with taxpayer funds and encouraged euthanasia for the elderly. By the time of the election, Cravaack characterized the bill as an example of socialized medicine that would result in the rationing of medical care.

=== Tenure ===
Following his election in November 2010, Cravaack backed fellow Minnesota Representative Michele Bachmann for the number four GOP leadership position of House Republican Conference chair.

In March 2011, Cravaack came under criticism by Duluth students and community leaders for voting for a budget bill that made cuts to the federal Pell Grant program that provides financial aid to college students, including 30 percent of the students at the University of Minnesota Duluth. He also received attention for implying during a House Homeland Security Committee hearing that Los Angeles County Sheriff Lee Baca was furthering the goals of a terrorist organization.

In March 2012, Cravaack introduced a bill in Congress that would have allowed mining and logging in the Boundary Waters Canoe Area Wilderness and Superior National Forest through a land exchange that would rely on the state environmental review process and bypass federal environmental reviews, with proceeds going to the school districts.

He also sponsored a bill, which became law, that required the TSA to treat military personnel with respect while traveling on orders or in uniform. "The bill's intent, he said, is that the military personnel would be able to go through security with the same ease as registered flyers."

Cravaack opposed sequestration and voted against the Budget Control Act, saying, "You cut with a scalpel, not a meat ax."

=== Committee assignments ===
112th Congress

- Committee on Homeland Security
  - Subcommittee on Counterterrorism and Intelligence
  - Subcommittee on Transportation Security
- Committee on Transportation and Infrastructure
  - Subcommittee on Aviation (Vice Chair)
  - Subcommittee on Coast Guard and Maritime Transportation
  - Subcommittee on Water Resources and Environment
- Committee on Science, Space and Technology
  - Subcommittee on Technology and Innovation

=== 2012 Re-election bid ===
In the 2012 election, Cravaack was endorsed by the Mesabi Daily News in Virginia and the Duluth News Tribune. On November 6, he lost his seat to former Democratic congressman Rick Nolan, by 31,456 votes.

== Electoral history ==
2010 Eighth Congressional District of Minnesota Elections
Party	Candidate	Votes	%
Republican	Chip Cravaack	133,490	48.2%
Democratic (DFL)	James Oberstar (incumbent)	129,091	46.6%
Independence	Timothy Olson	11,876	4.3%
Constitution	Richard (George) Burton	2,492	0.9%
	Write-ins	132	.01%
Total votes		277,081	100.0
Turnout			70
Republican gain from Democratic (DFL)			

2012 Eighth Congressional District of Minnesota Elections
Party	Candidate	Votes	%
Democratic (DFL)	Rick Nolan	191,976	54.3%
Republican	Chip Cravaack (incumbent)	160,520	45.4%
	Write-ins	1,167	0.3%
Total votes		353,665	100.0
Turnout			
Democratic (DFL) gain from Republican			

== Personal life ==
Cravaack was twice married and twice divorced. He first married Jill Ann Jurgensen in 1984. After they divorced, he then married Traci Rae Gordon on December 31, 1993 in Hennepin County, Minnesota They had two sons, and they divorced in 2011. From 2016 to 2022, he taught social studies at Bishop Guertin High School, a Catholic College Preparatory School in Nashua, New Hampshire.

== Notes ==
U.S. House of Representatives
Preceded by James Oberstar	Member of the U.S. House of Representatives from Minnesota's 8th congressional district 2011–2013	Succeeded by Rick Nolan
U.S. order of precedence (ceremonial)
Preceded by John Duarte as Former U.S. Representative	Order of precedence of the United States as Former U.S. Representative	Succeeded by Jason Lewis as Former U.S. Representative
