= Gowon =

Gowon or Go Won may refer to:

- Yakubu Gowon (born 1934), head of the Federal Military Government of Nigeria from 1966 to 1975
- Kowon County, North Korea
- "Go Won", a single formally introducing the eleventh member of Loona
- Go Won, singer in South Korean girl group Loona and Loossemble

== See also ==
- Gowan (disambiguation)
