= John Hayes (explorer) =

British naval officer and explorer

Sir John Hayes
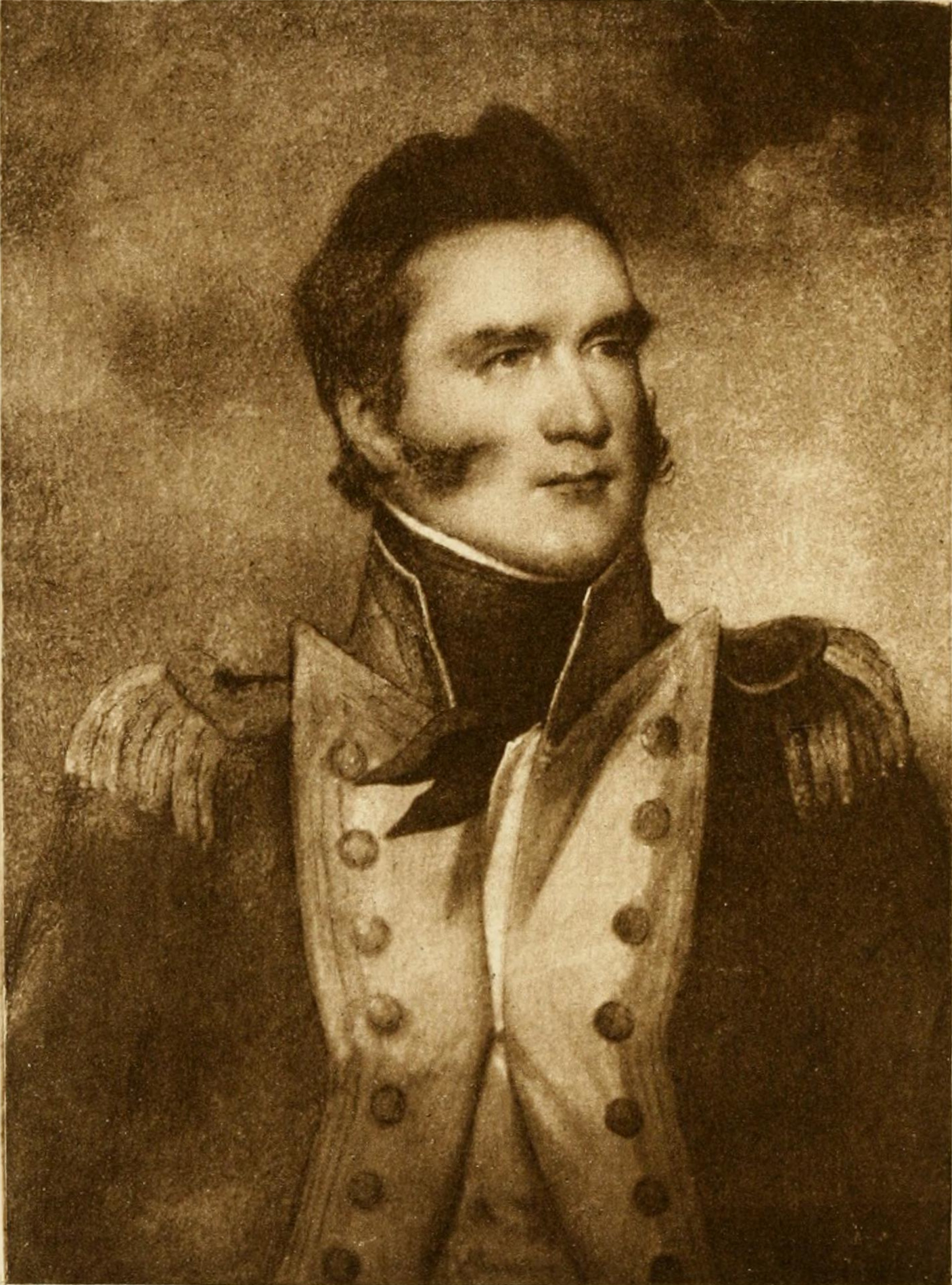
- A portrait of Hayes
- Born: February 1768; Bridekirk, Cumberland
- Died: July 3, 1831 (aged 63) Cocos (Keeling) Islands
- Allegiance: East India Company
- Branch: Bombay Marine; Indian Navy
- Service years: 1781–1831
- Rank: Commodore
- Conflicts: Second Anglo-Mysore War; Third Anglo-Mysore War; Napoleonic Wars; Invasion of Java (1811); First Anglo-Burmese War
- Spouse: Katherine Pyne (m. 1795–1831)
- Children: 4
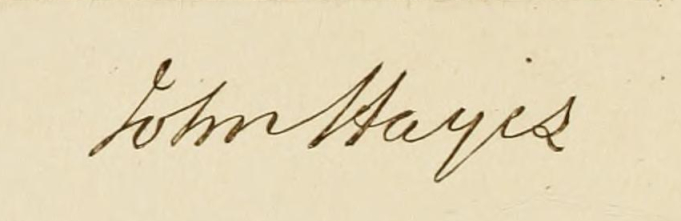
- Signature

Commodore Sir John Hayes (February 1768 – 3 July 1831) was a British naval officer and explorer who served in the Bombay Marine and later the Indian Navy.

Hayes was born in Bridekirk, Cumberland, the son of Fletcher Hayes and Elizabeth Martin. On 7 December 1781, at the age of 13, he joined the Bombay Marine as a midshipman on HCS Bombay, a 24-gun grab.

On 6 February 1793, Hayes departed from Calcutta on a private trading voyage with two chartered merchantmen: the 14-gun Duke of Clarence and the armed snow Duchess. The original goal of the voyage was to collect nutmeg from New Guinea, but adverse winds near Timor led Hayes to reroute around the southern coast of Australia to resupply at Adventure Bay.

He spent several weeks exploring the area of the River Derwent, unaware that it had already been charted by Antoine Bruni d'Entrecasteaux. Hayes named many geographic features, often in honour of East India Company personnel or shipmates. Some of these names, such as the River Derwent and Risdon Cove, remain in use today.

Hayes departed Tasmania on 9 June and reached New Caledonia on 28 June, where he continued his exploratory work. He later became the first European to land on Rossel Island.

Hayes participated in multiple military campaigns during his career, including the Second Anglo-Mysore War, Third Anglo-Mysore War, the Napoleonic Wars—notably the Invasion of Java (1811)—and the First Anglo-Burmese War. He died in the Cocos (Keeling) Islands in the Bay of Bengal while en route to Calcutta at the age of 63. His only son, Captain Fletcher Fulton Compton Hayes, was later killed in Awadh during the Indian Rebellion of 1857.

== Voyage of 1793 and Exploration of Tasmania ==
In early 1793, Hayes undertook a privately backed commercial and exploratory voyage aboard the Duke of Clarence, accompanied by the Duchess, a smaller snow of 100 tons. The expedition was organised in Calcutta by a group of East India Company merchants—Udney, Frushard, and Laprimandaye—interested in the spice trade. Hayes, Captain Court, and a Mr. Robertson agreed to serve without pay, with only their living expenses covered. The expedition departed Calcutta on 6 February 1793.

Originally intending to sail to western New Guinea, the ships encountered unexpected southeast trade winds and altered course. On 24 April, they reached Van Diemen's Land (now Tasmania), and Hayes landed the following day at Adventure Bay, unaware that the French expedition under Antoine Bruni d'Entrecasteaux had departed from the same location only weeks earlier.

Hayes undertook extensive coastal surveys in southeastern Tasmania, naming features such as Risdon Cove, Ralphs Bay, and Court’s Island. He renamed the French Rivière du Nord the River Derwent, and further inland he identified what he called King George’s Plains. He also designated the estuary as Fletcher Hayes' Gulf.

His chart of Van Diemen’s Land, dedicated to John Shore, 1st Baron Teignmouth, chairman of the East India Company, bore a number of English place names. These included New Yorkshire (north of the Derwent), New Cumberland (west of what is now D'Entrecasteaux Channel), and The Honourable William Pitt’s Isle (now Bruny Island). D’Entrecasteaux Channel itself appeared on Hayes’s map as Seton’s Strait, named after another company merchant, while Betsey Island may have been named for a Bombay Marine vessel.

Though Hayes later realised many of his ‘discoveries’ had already been recorded by the French, his charts were still influential. Matthew Flinders used a copy during his circumnavigation of Tasmania in 1798–99, correcting terminology but preserving most names.

During the expedition, tensions emerged with Mr. Robertson, the supercargo, who challenged Hayes’s authority and attempted to assert ownership over the ships. Hayes confined him and reported the matter to Calcutta authorities.

Hayes continued his voyage on 9 June, departing for New Caledonia, again unknowingly retracing the path of d’Entrecasteaux. In correspondence, Hayes expressed pride in his discoveries, writing: “I have discovered a strait abounding with many fine harbours... On the west side... some fine plains extending to the foot of a large mountain... I called [them] King George’s Plains.” He recorded the location at 42°47′30″ S, 147°30′54″ E, noting the presence of white cockatoos and colourful stones akin to carnelian.

Although ultimately overshadowed by French explorers and British surveyors like Flinders and George Bass, Hayes's 1793 voyage was a significant early British exploration of southeastern Tasmania. His naming of Risdon Cove proved especially enduring: a decade later, it became the site of the first British settlement in Tasmania under Lieutenant John Bowen.
