= McGoohan =

McGoohan is an Irish and Scottish surname. Notable people with the surname include:

- Patrick McGoohan (1928–2009), Irish-American actor, known for The Prisoner
- Catherine McGoohan (born 1952), British actress, daughter of Patrick McGoohan

== See also ==
- Ken McGoogan (born 1947), Canadian author
- McGowan
