= Risdon Cove =

Cove near Hobart, Tasmania, Australia

Coordinates: 42°49′23″S 147°19′09″E

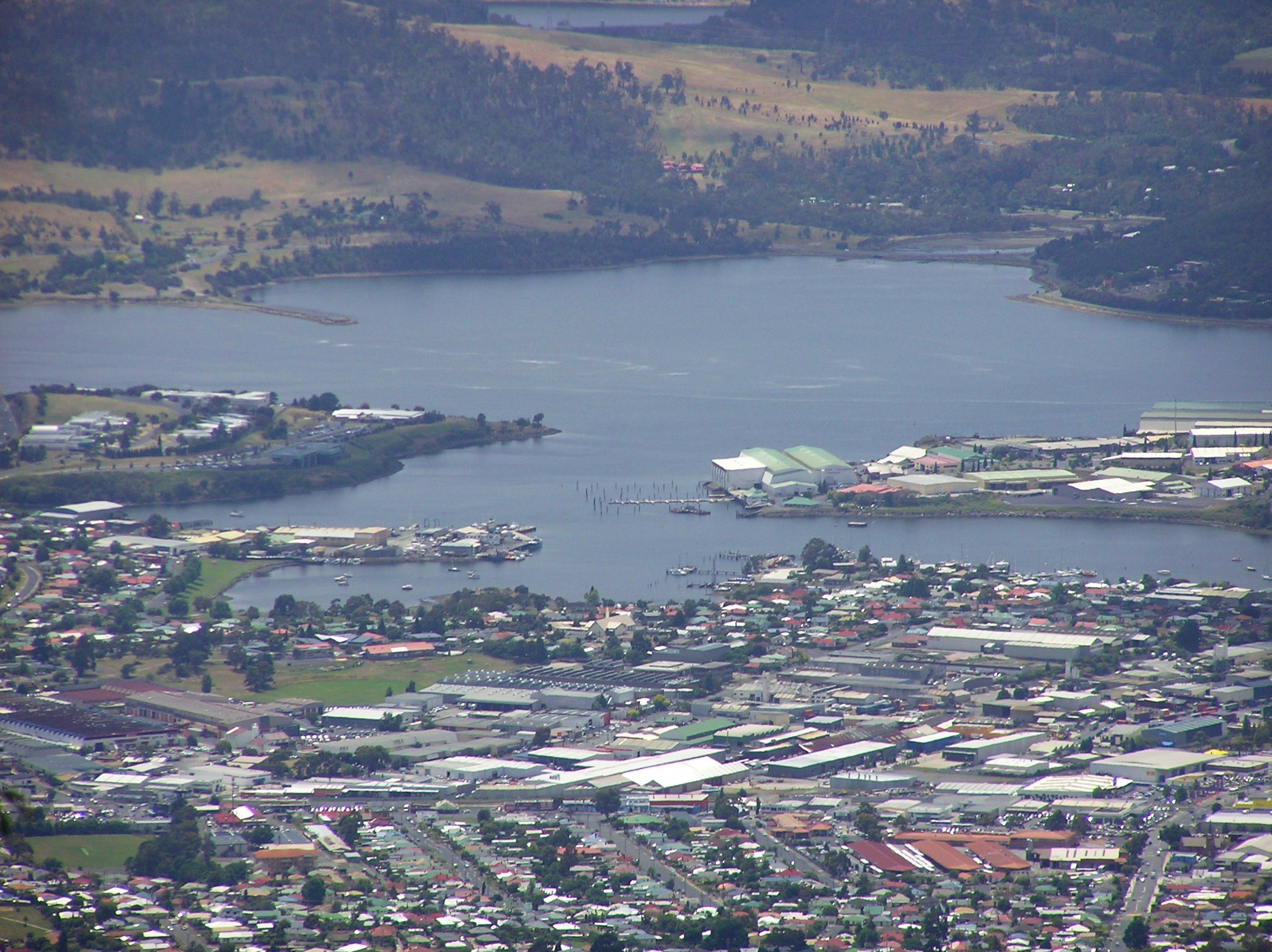
Risdon Cove, on the far side of the River Derwent

Risdon Cove is a cove located on the east bank of the River Derwent, approximately 7 kilometres (4 mi) north of Hobart, Tasmania. It was the site of the first British settlement in Van Diemen's Land, now Tasmania, the island state of Australia. The cove was named by John Hayes, who mapped the river in the ship Duke of Clarence in 1794, after his second officer William Bellamy Risdon.

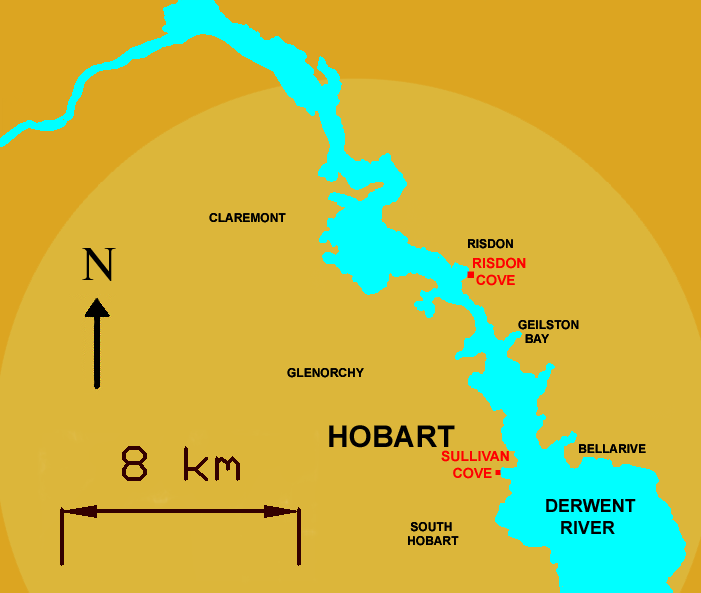
Map of Hobart showing locations of Risdon and Sullivans Cove

In 1803 Lieutenant John Bowen was sent to establish a settlement in Van Diemen's Land. On the advice of the explorer George Bass he had chosen Risdon Cove. While the site was a good one from a defensive point of view, the soil was poor and water scarce. Lady Nelson anchored at Risdon on the eastern shore of the River Derwent on Wednesday 8 September 1803, five days before the whaler Albion arrived with Lt. Bowen on board. The 49 people aboard the Lady Nelson and Albion made a curious party of soldiers, sailors, settlers and convicts.

In 1804 Lieutenant Colonel David Collins arrived in the Derwent from Port Phillip on Ocean. Within a few days he rejected Risdon Cove as a suitable settlement site, for its inadequate source of fresh water, and moved his party across the river to Sullivans Cove. The military and convicts disembarked from Ocean near Hunter Island on 20–21 February 1804 and thus beginning what is now Hobart. Lady Nelson landed the free settlers at New Town Bay on 22 February.

One of the first land grants at Risdon Cove was made to Dr William F A I'Anson, the chief surgeon who arrived with Lieutenant-Governor Collins in 1804.

== 19th century ==
On 3 May 1804 a number of aboriginal Tasmanians were killed by guards of the fledgling British settlement. The events occurred in mysterious circumstances, perhaps as the result of a misunderstanding. The original records show that a large group of Aboriginals walked into the fledgling settlement. The settlement's guards mistakenly thought they were under attack and killed some of the intruders.

== 20th century ==
The site at Risdon Cove was farmed until 1946. By the 150th anniversary celebrations (September 1954) land had been acquired by the State Government to add to the reserve. Angela McGowan excavated the site in 1978–80.

The hand-over of the Risdon Cove site, which includes the Bowen Memorial, was part of the Aboriginal Lands Act 1995. The transfer occurred on 11 December 1995, and since then Aboriginal Tasmanians have maintained and developed the site as a cultural and an educational facility.
