= Martin McGowan =

Martin McGowan may refer to:

- Martin McGowan (footballer) (born 1962), Scottish footballer
- Martin McGowan (Irish politician) (died 1958), Irish politician and teacher
- Martin J. McGowan Jr. (1920–2009), American politician and newspaper editor
