= Angela McGowan =

Archaeologist

Angela McGowan is an Australian archaeologist known for her work on Aboriginal and European heritage and culture in Tasmania, Australia. McGowan predominantly worked in Heard Island, off the coast of Antarctica and Tasmania.

== Cultural heritage archaeology and advocacy ==
McGowan has spent over thirty years working in Tasmania in the cultural heritage management sector. More specifically for Heritage Tasmania, the Parks and Wildlife Service, the Tasmanian Museum and Art Gallery and in private practice. She joined the executive committee of the International Council on Monuments and Sites (ICOMOS) in February 2010, having previously served on the Tasmanian Heritage Council and is also a member of the Australasian Society for Historical Archaeology, the National Trust of Australia (TAS) and Cultural Heritage Practitioners of Tasmania.

She has spoken directly to the gaps in legislation regarding consultation, involvement, and representation of aboriginal communities. Her paper titled “Background to Changing Cultural Heritage Legislation in Tasmania” clearly and methodically covers the National Parks and Wildlife Act of 1970, Aboriginal Relics Act of 1975, and the Forestry Act of 1920, to name a few, revealing the imbalance in representation on each committee. McGowan brings to our attention that out of the twelve members under the National Parks and Wildlife Act only one representative is allocated historic structures, history, and anthropology while others are natural science based, and out of five on the Aboriginal Relics Advisory Council one member was a representative of Aboriginal interests while the rest were academic.

== Select archaeological investigations of Tasmania ==
=== Risdon Cove (1978-1980) ===
Risdon Cove, Tasmania is historically recognized as the initial site of Hobart, the capital of Tasmania. Risdon Cove was established as a military base of the New South Wales military forces in September 1803, in order to prevent French explorers and militant forces from gaining access to settlement on Tasmania. This site is primarily remembered for the massacre of aboriginal people on 3 May 1804 by British forces. Risdon Cove was abandoned in July 1804.

Angela Gowan excavated the site of Risdon Cove. After the abandonment of the site, the area had remained in its pre-industrialized state when McGowan conducted the excavations. McGowan discovered twenty-nine archaeological features on the site, but she determined there to be only six key features dating back to the initial settlement of 1803. Features made out of stone were the only ones structurally sound enough to last two hundred years. The six key features are as follows: "the storehouse, the storekeeper's house, the Governor's new house, Mountgarrett's house, a hut platform, and an enclosed clearing". Of the six items determined to be dated back to 1803, the storehouse, the Governor's new house, and the Mountgarett's house provide the most information on the building patterns and culture of the first settlement.

The storehouse was an essential part of the initial settlement, because it displayed an intention of residing on the settlement for an extended amount of time. The Governor's new house, due to the high status of Lieutenant John Bowen, was intended to be the "largest and most dominant building of the settlement." McGowan's excavation revealed the house to have never been completed. In terms of the Mountgarett's house, McGowan determined the house to be built for the naval surgeon, and it was the first residential building to have been built on the settlement.

=== Denison River Valley (1989) ===
This was a long-term study done into human activity during the late Pleistocene era in the Denison River Valley. McGowan, along with a team of other archaeologists, was able to find 23 different rock shelters across the valley. In order to determine if humans had once lived in these rock shelters, the team would look on the walls for paintings and the floors for artifacts. If nothing was discovered then they would create speed pits, which are holes dug into the ground that are less than 15 cm wide. Six of these rock shelters, as well as one location in the open, showed evidence of human activity. Two of these sites were excavated in detail to determine the extent of human activity. In total from all of these sites, they found 218 artifacts that are greater than 0.5 cm in size. This provided extensive information about stone artifact technology and how it related to human activity throughout the late Pleistocene era.

== Survey of Sealing Sites on Heard Island (1986-1987) ==
One excavation that Angela McGowan has worked on are the sealer sites on Heard Island. She worked on this site in 1986 and 1987. The main reason that she wanted to shine a spotlight here is because the archaeological information at this site is being threatened by the wildlife and erosion of the coastline. This site gives a very unique perspective into the lives of European sealers in the 19th century, and so she wanted to save all of this information. She excavated the sites that were the most damaged sites first so that they could get the most data as possible.

== Kerry Lodge Convict site (2015-2018) ==
The Kerry Lodge Convict project is located near Laucenston, Tasmania and is the site of a 19th-century British penal colony. McGowan was part of a small team made up of archaeologists, surveyors, and curators who invested time uncovering details of the relatively unknown site, their interests lay in the archaeology of incarceration and unfree labor. The main focus of the project is to excavate and analyze the "remains of a collapsed stone structure associated with the convict probation station."

== Further publications ==
- Archaeological investigations at Risdon Cove Historic Site: 1978–1980
- Excavations at Lithend, Port Arthur Historic Site
- Photogrammetric recording of Aboriginal Paintings in Keyhole Cavern
- Report of Radiocarbon Dating Analyses
