= Future Problem Solving Program International =

Non-profit educational program

- Abbreviation: FPSPI
- Established: 1974; 52 years ago
- Founder: Ellis Paul Torrance
- Type: Educational program
- Legal status: 501(c)(3)
- Headquarters: Melbourne, Florida
- Website: fpspi.org

Future Problem Solving Program International (FPSPI), originally known as Future Problem Solving Program (FPSP), and often abbreviated to FPS, is a non-profit educational program that organizes academic competitions in which students apply critical thinking and problem-solving skills to hypothetical future situations. The program looks at current technological, geopolitical, and societal trends and projects those trends 20–30 years into the future in order to train students to develop solutions to the challenges they may face as adults. FPSPI was founded by creativity researcher Ellis Paul Torrance in 1974. Today, thousands of students from over 14 countries participate in the program each year. Most FPSPI components are open to students who are in the equivalent of the U.S. grade level range of 4 through 12. Divisions range from junior (4-6), middle (7-9), and senior (10-12+)

== Structure ==
FPSPI consists of state and nationwide organizations called affiliates. Each affiliate is responsible for conducting the competitions which take place in its own geographic area. Students begin preparing for competition at the start of each school year. Depending on the affiliate and the type of competition, there may be regional, state, or national levels of competition that take place during the year. Only the winners of any given competition qualify to proceed to the next level. The highest level of competition takes place at the annual International Conference (IC), which is held in May or June, at the end of the United States' school year. The IC is held at the campus of a public university in the United States (the country with the largest number of competitors), with a new location being chosen every two years.

== Pedagogy ==
FPSPI was originally founded to train students to use a specific six-step problem-solving process:

1. Identify challenges that exist in a given situation.
2. Pick a high-impact "Underlying Problem" to focus on, formulated as an attainable goal that addresses the problem.
3. Brainstorm solutions to the Underlying Problem.
4. Develop criteria that measure solutions' positive impact on people affected by the Underlying Problem.
5. Evaluate and rank the solutions using the criteria.
6. Develop an elaborated Action Plan based on the highest-ranking solution.

The original Future Problem Solving competition—now known as Global Issues Problem Solving (GIPS)—evaluates students' competency in using this problem-solving process in the context of a fictional future situation. Students in the GIPS competition are grouped into grade level ranges and may compete as individuals or as teams of four. Prior to each competition event, FPSPI announces the competition topic (such as "Artificial Intelligence" or "Oceans") and provides a list of suggested readings. Students spend 1–2 months researching the topic with an eye to potential future challenges and solutions. At the beginning of the competition, students are given a Future Scene (FS), a one- to two-page document that describes the hypothetical future situation having to do with the pre-announced topic. Competitors then proceed according to the six-step process. Students are graded on their correct application of the process and on their use of cited research and creative originality.

FPSPI later developed additional programs that make use of the six-step problem-solving process, or that otherwise train students in creative critical thinking. In the Community Problem Solving (CmPS) competition, students are evaluated on how well they apply the process to present-day problems in their own community. The Action-based Problem Solving (AbPS) program adapts the process for classroom use. In the Scenario Writing competition, students write a short story, set at least 20 years in the future, based on one of the GIPS competition topics. The Scenario Performance component is similar but is geared toward students who prefer telling stories through oral communication. Finally, students can also compete in the Presentation of Action Plan competition. After completing the six-step process in two hours, students then immediately begin work on a second competition called "Presentation of Action Plan" in which they illustrate their final solution by preparing and performing a skit.

== Topic history ==
Each year on June 1st, FPSPI releases the four topics for the Practice Problem 1, Practice Problem 2, Qualifying Problem, and Affiliate Bowl competitions for the following school year. Since 2024, they have released the World Solutions Challenge topic on July 1st for that school year. Finally, each year on March 1st, FPSPI releases the International Conference topic for that school year.

List of past and current FPSPI topics
Academic Year	World Solutions Challenge	Practice Problem 1	Practice Problem 2	Qualifying Problem	Affiliate Bowl	International Conference
2026-2027	TBA	Digital Dark Age	Disappearing Cultures	Influencer Marketing	Health Security	TBA
2025-2026	Rising Sea Levels	Invasive Species	Space Exploration	Video Games	Surveillance	Forestry
2024-2025	Artificial Intelligence	Food Security	Rising Sea Levels	Agricultural Industry	Nanotechnology	The Future of History
2023-2024		Tourism	Urbanization	Antarctica	Autonomous Transportation	Air Quality
2022-2023		E-Waste	Digital Realities	Robotic Workforce	Throw-Away Society	Currency
2021-2022		Water Supply	Building Green	Insects	Mining	Antibiotic Resistance
2020–2021		Youth In Competitive Sports	Wearable Technology	Human Environmental Impact	Personalized Medicine	Neurotechnology
2019–2020		International Travel	Sleep Patterns	Gamification	Living in Poverty	Terraforming
2018–2019		Mission to Moon, Mars, and Beyond	Drones	Food Loss & Waste	Coping with Stress	De-Extinction
2017–2018		Spread of Infectious Disease	Toxic Materials	Philanthrocapitalism	Cloud Storage	Criminal Justice Systems
2016–2017		Educational Disparities	It's All in the Genes	3D Printing	Identity Theft	Biosecurity
2015–2016		Treatment of Animals	Disappearing Languages	Recovering from Natural Disasters	The Global Workplace	Energy of the Future
2014–2015		The Impact of Social Media	Processed Foods	Propaganda	Enhancing Human Potential	Intellectual Property
2013–2014		Social Isolation	Desertification	Surveillance Society	Land Transportation	Space
2012–2013		Culture of Celebrity	Robotic Age	Megacities	Ocean Soup	Global Status of Women
2011–2012		All in a Day's Work	Coral Reefs	Human Rights	Trade Barriers	Pharmaceuticals
2010–2011		Healthy Living	Air Transport	Genetic Testing	Water Quality	Emergency Planning
2009–2010		Sensory Overload	Invasive Species	Orphaned Children	Food Distribution	Green Living
2008–2009		Olympic Games	Cyber Conflict	Space Junk	Counterfeit Economy	Pandemic
2007–2008		Body Enhancement	Simulation Technology	Neurotechnology	Debt in Developing Countries	Child Labor
2006–2007		Fundraising and Charity Giving	Protection of National Treasures	Cultural Prejudice	Caring for Our Elders	Privacy
2005–2006		Climate Change/Threat	Freedom of Speech	Nutrition	Health Care Access	Redistribution of Wealth
2004–2005		Entertainment	Terrorism/Security	Agriculture of the 21st Century	Depletion of Oceanic Species	Business Crime
2003–2004		Smart Clothes	Rage/Bullying	Artificial Intelligence	Media Impact	Immigration
2002–2003		Sports Medicine	E-Commerce	Nanotechnology	DNA Identification	Worldwide Communications
2001–2002		Alternative Energy	Educational Options	Organ Donation	Environmental Law	Virtual Corporations
2000–2001		Tourism	World Population	Water	Habitat	International Relations
1999–2000		Fads	Financial Security	Amateur Sports	The Internet	Genetic Engineering
1998–1999		Undersea Living	Computer Error	Life Long Learning	Prison Alternatives	Distribution of Wealth
1997–1998		Natural Disasters	Freedom	Women in the Workplace	Non-Traditional Families	Medical Ethics
1996–1997		Homes of the Future	Extraterrestrial Life	Cashless Society	Competition	Increasing Life Span
1995-1996		Firearms	Mental Health	21st Century Marketplace	Cybernetics	United Nations
1994-1995		Cities	Homelessness	Kids and Violence	Prejudice	Privacy
1993-1994		Robotic	Antarctica	Extinction of Animals	Space Law	Control of Disease
1992-1993		Stress on Students	Hunger	Oceans	Drugs	Nuclear Waste
1991-1992		Space Exploration	Legal Epidemic	Sports Ethics	Land Use	Advertising
1990-1991		High School Dropouts	Ozone Depletion	Transportation	Censorship	Corruption in Government
1989-1990		Shrinking Tropical Rainforests	The Arms Race	Poverty	Medical Advances	Crime
1988-1989		Energy Sources	Youth and the Law	Nutrition	Employment	Terrorism
1987-1988		Space Travel	The Elderly	Acid Rain	Immigration	Birth Defects
1986-1987		Garbage	Changing Family Structures	Water	Illiteracy	The Impact of Media
1985-1986		Endangered Species	Feeding the World	Artificial Intelligence	American Legal System	Organ Transplants
1984-1985		Drunk Driving	Nuclear War	Education	The Greenhouse Effect	Industrialization of Space
1983-1984		Electronic Games	Prisons	Lasers	Nuclear Waste	Genetic Engineering
1982-1983		Ocean Communities	Robotics	Pet Overpopulation	Computers	Nuclear War
1981-1982		Child Abuse	Extranormal Mental Powers	Drug Use	Endangered Wildlife	Space Colonization
1980-1981		Solar Energy	Transportation	Home Computers	Hunger & Malnutrition	Increased Longevity
1979-1980		Transportation	Space Travel	Ocean Farming	Hypnosis & Psychic Energy	Alternative Energy Sources

== Notable alumni ==
- Allison Schroeder, Academy Award-nominated screenwriter
- Meganne Christian, astronaut and researcher
- Jack Petocz, LGBTQ+ Activist
