= James Gowans =

James Gowans may refer to:

- Sir James Gowans (architect) (1821–1890), Scottish architect and quarry owner
- James Gowans (rugby union) (1872–1936), Scottish rugby union player
- Sir James Learmonth Gowans (1924–2020), English immunologist
- James Gowans (Australian footballer) (born 1977), Australian footballer

== See also ==
- James Gowan (1923–2015), Scottish-born architect
- James Robert Gowan (1815–1909), Canadian lawyer, judge, and senator
