= USS McGowan =

Fletcher-class destroyer

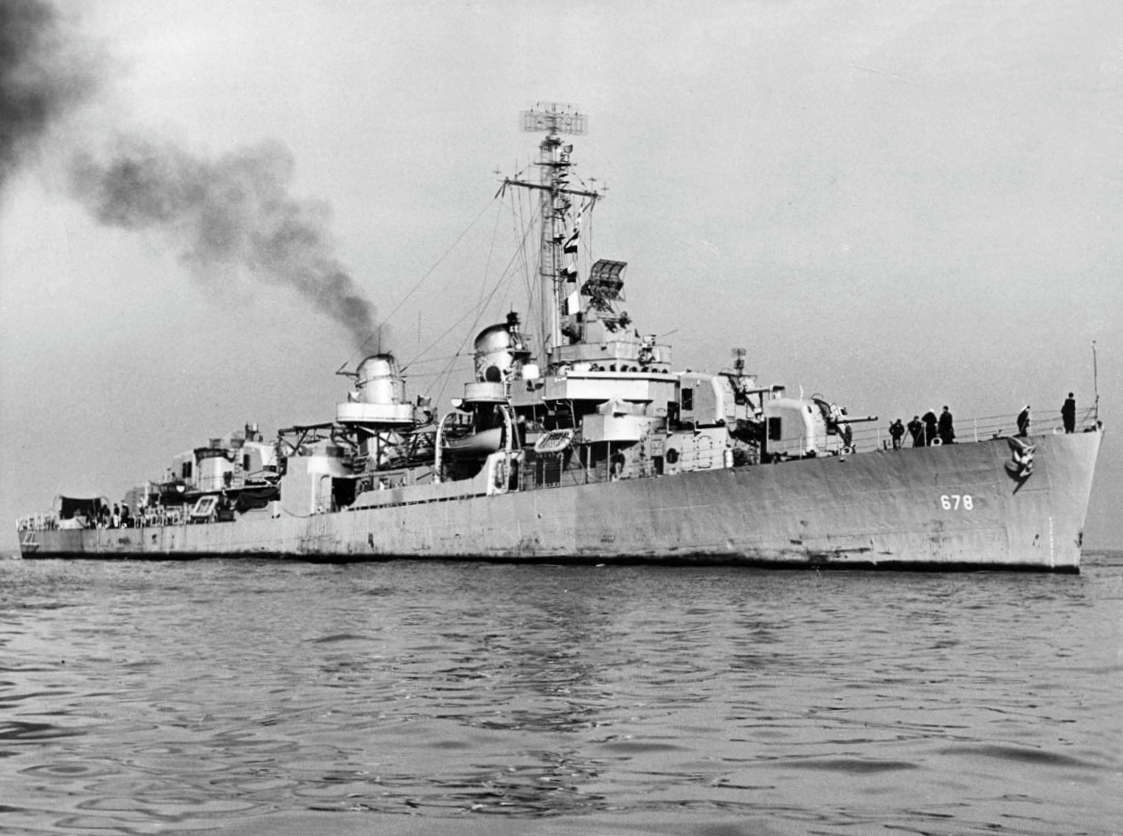
- USS McGowan (DD-678)

History

United States
- Name: McGowan
- Namesake: Samuel McGowan
- Builder: Federal Shipbuilding & Dry Dock Co., Kearny, N.J.
- Laid down: 30 June 1943
- Launched: 14 November 1943
- Commissioned: 20 December 1943
- Decommissioned: 30 November 1960
- Stricken: 1 October 1972
- Fate: Transferred to Spain, 1 December 1960

Spain
- Name: Jorge Juan
- Namesake: Jorge Juan y Santacilia
- Acquired: 1 December 1960
- Commissioned: 1 December 1960
- Stricken: 15 November 1988
- Fate: Scrapped

General characteristics
- Class & type: Fletcher-class destroyer; Lepanto-class destroyer
- Displacement: 2,050 tons
- Length: 376 ft 6 in (114.7 m)
- Beam: 39 ft 8 in (12.1 m)
- Draft: 17 ft 9 in (5.4 m)
- Propulsion: 60,000 shp (45 MW); geared turbines; 2 propellers
- Speed: 38 knots (70 km/h; 44 mph)
- Range: 6,500 nautical miles at 15 kt; (12,000 km at 30 km/h)
- Complement: 319
- Armament: 5 × 5 in (130 mm)/38 guns, 10 × 40 mm AA guns, 7 × 20 mm AA guns, 10 × 21 inch (533 mm) torpedo tubes, 6 × depth charge projectors, 2 × depth charge tracks

USS McGowan (DD-678) was a Fletcher-class destroyer of the United States Navy, named for Rear Admiral Samuel McGowan (1870–1934).

McGowan was laid down 30 June 1943 by the Federal Shipbuilding & Dry Dock Co., Kearny, N.J. launched 14 November 1943, sponsored by Mrs. Rose McG. Cantey, sister of Rear Admiral McGowan, and commissioned 20 December 1943.

== World War II ==
Post shakedown training completed in time to participate in the Marianas campaign, McGowan arrived at Roi, Kwajalein Atoll, 31 May 1944. Ten days later she sailed with Task Group 52.17 (TG 52.17) for Saipan. On 14 June she screened the bombardment ships. The next day, during the invasion of Saipan she added fire support to her duties, disposing of a fuel dump and artillery emplacements endangering forces on the beach. As the beachhead expanded, McGowan continued to support the assault forces with counter-battery and harassing fire until the 23d, when she retired to Eniwetok. Next assigned to TG 53.1 she screened the transports carrying troops to Guam, remained through the initial landing operations, and then set course back to Saipan. There she rejoined TG 52.17 for screening and fire support missions during the Tinian phase of the conquest of the Marianas.

At the end of July McGowan sailed to Guadalcanal to prepare for the amphibious assault on the Palaus. Her TG 32.2, sortied 8 September, arriving in the transport area east of the Palaus on the 15th. McGowan remained in that area until the 17th when, with her transport group she moved toward Angaur Island. There she took position in the antisubmarine screen, remaining through the 22d.

The destroyer then cruised south to Manus Island, the staging area for the upcoming Leyte operation. On 11 October she got underway, screening LSTs and LCIs of the 7th Fleet to Leyte. During the assault on Dulag, 20 October she served as fighter-director for aircraft covering the landings. In the early hours of the 25th she participated in DesRon 54's torpedo attack on Japanese men-of-war, weakening them as they steamed Up Surigao Strait into defeat at the hands of Rear Admiral Jesse B. Oldendorf and his battleline.

Within 48 hours McGowan was underway for Hollandia, from where she screened convoys to the Philippines until after the Mindoro landings in December. She sailed into Lingayen Gulf, 11 January 1945, to take part in the Luzon offensive. As part of the antiaircraft screen off the San Fabian beachhead, she warded off the kamikaze suicide planes of the Japanese Special Attack Corps until the 14th, when she returned to escort work.

At the end of the month she joined the fast carriers (then 5th Fleet's Task Force 58, later 3rd Fleet's TF 38), getting underway with them 8 February. Speeding north, they struck at Honshū in mid-February. Next, setting a southerly course, they supported the Iwo Jima campaign and then, in March returned to the Japanese home islands for further strikes. Throughout April and May they provided support for the troops fighting on Okinawa as they struck at enemy military and industrial targets from Formosa to Kyūshū. Replenishing in the Philippines in early June, they extended their range northward again and by 1 July were headed for objectives on Honshū, Hokkaidō and the Kuriles.

Following the strikes on the Kuriles, McGowan was detached from TF 38 and ordered back to the west coast for overhaul. While at Adak, Alaska, 14 August, she received word of the Japanese surrender. Assigned to the 9th Fleet she steamed back to Japan for occupation duty in the Ominato Naval Base area. On 12 October she departed Honshū for the United States. Arriving in November she underwent overhaul, and on 30 April 1946 she decommissioned and entered the San Diego Group, Pacific Reserve Fleet.

== 1951 – 1960 ==
Less than 6 years later the outbreak of hostilities in Korea required an expansion of the active fleet. McGowan recommissioned 6 July 1951 and by 1952 had transited the Panama Canal and reported for duty in the Atlantic Fleet. By May she was involved in training for Far Eastern deployment. She departed Newport, R.I. 6 September and arrived at Yokosuka, Japan 20 October. On 17 November, following operations with TF 96 off Okinawa, McGowan rendezvoused with TF 77 in the combat area. As a unit of the U.N. Naval Force she cruised along the Korean east coast providing close fire support for U.N. troops and periodically took station off Wonsan to bombard. Upon leaving the battle area she called at Buckner and Subic Bays, Singapore, Calcutta, Aden, Suez, and Gibraltar, arriving Newport 11 April 1953.

Home ported there, McGowan operated on the eastern seaboard, deploying annually to the Mediterranean, for the next 7 years. During her 1956–58 oversee deployments she was involved in peace keeping operations in the volatile eastern Mediterranean. In the spring of 1956 she cruised in the Red Sea area and then the Port Said area as British troops withdrew from the Suez Canal zone, returning to Newport before nationalization of the canal. Subsequent events led, in the fall, to the brief war between British, French, Israeli, and Egyptian forces. Tension remained high and in May 1957 McGowan was back in the Mediterranean. On the 22d, she, with three other ships of Destroyer Division 202 (DesDiv 202), became the first warships to transit the Suez Canal since its reopening to maximum draft ships (9 April 1957). She then cruised in the Red Sea and the Persian Gulf to insure safe passage of American merchant shipping to Israel and Jordan.

By late spring of 1958, as McGowan again returned to the eastern Mediterranean, Jordan and Lebanon were threatened with coups d'état in the continued struggle for leadership of the Arab world. In July, President Camille Chamoun of Lebanon requested the aid of the United States in insuring the stability of his government, while Jordan made a similar request to Britain. On the 15th, the 6th Fleet stood off the Lebanese coast while landing the Marines. On the 16th, McGowan arrived from another tense area, Cyprus. She remained at Beirut through the 20th, then got underway to take a patrol station off the coast, remaining until 1 August. She resumed operations to the north, and in September departed for Newport. arriving on the 30th.

== Spanish service ==
In October 1960 McGowan was designated for transfer to the Government of Spain on a renewable 5-year loan under the terms of the Military Assistance Program. On 30 November 1960, at Barcelona, McGowan decommissioned and the following day became the Spanish Navy's Jorge Juan (originally with hull number 45, designated D 25 in 1961).

Jorge Juan was stricken from the Spanish Navy list on 15 November 1988, then scrapped.

== Awards ==
McGowan received nine battle stars for World War II service, and two for Korean War service.
