= Robert McGowan =

Robert McGowan may refer to:

- Robert F. McGowan (1882–1955), American film director and producer
- Robert A. McGowan (1901–1955), American screenwriter and film director
