= Samuel McGowan (admiral) =

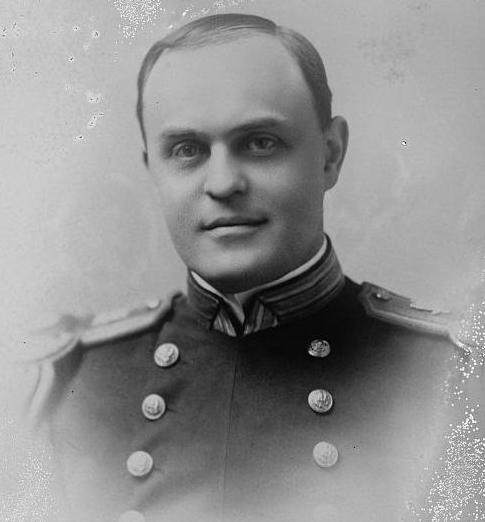
- Rear Admiral Samuel McGowan
- Born: September 1, 1870; Laurens, South Carolina, U.S.
- Died: November 11, 1934 (aged 64); Laurens, South Carolina, U.S.
- Military career
- Allegiance: United States of America
- Branch: United States Navy
- Rank: Rear Admiral
- Commands: Bureau of Supplies and Accounts
- Conflicts: World War I
- Awards: Distinguished Service Medal

Samuel McGowan (1 September 1870 – 11 November 1934) was an admiral of the United States Navy.

== Early life ==
McGowan, born at Laurens, South Carolina, on 1 September 1870, he attended Wofford College, Class of 1889, where he was a member of Chi Phi fraternity. He also was a Charter Member of the Tau Chapter of the Chi Phi Fraternity at the University of South Carolina in 1889.

== Military service ==
He was later commissioned assistant paymaster 15 March 1894. He became Fleet Paymaster for the US Atlantic Fleet, 1908–1910, acquiring that position in San Francisco when the fleet, later known as the Great White Fleet, was at that port of call during its 1907-1909 round-the-world cruise. It is believed that $800,000 (1909 face value) US Navy funds that were lost aboard RMS Republic when that vessel sank in 1909 were requisitioned by Fleet Paymaster McGowan. The funds were to be delivered to the Fleet at Gibraltar. On 1 July 1914, he was appointed Paymaster General and Chief of the Bureau of Supplies and Accounts with the rank of rear admiral. Holding that office until his retirement in 1920, he was awarded the Distinguished Service Medal for the preparation and execution of plans to maintain the fleets during World War I.

Following his military career he became the first Highway Commissioner of South Carolina. He did not drive but managed to travel the world three times over.

== Death ==
He died 11 November 1934 at Laurens.

== Namesake ==
In 1943, the destroyer USS McGowan (DD-678) was named in his honor.

McGowan Road at the Naval Support Activity Mechanicsburg.
