= John McGowan (Medal of Honor) =

- Born: 1831; Ireland
- Died: Unknown
- Military career
- Allegiance: United States
- Branch: United States Navy
- Rank: Quartermaster
- Unit: USS Varuna
- Conflicts: American Civil War • Battle of Forts Jackson and St. Philip
- Awards: Medal of Honor

John McGowan (born 1831, date of death unknown) was a Union Navy sailor in the American Civil War and a recipient of the U.S. military's highest decoration, the Medal of Honor, for his actions at the Battle of Forts Jackson and St. Philip.

== Biography ==
Born in 1831 in Ireland, McGowan immigrated to the United States and was living in New York when he joined the U.S. Navy. He served during the Civil War as a quartermaster on the USS Varuna. At the Battle of Forts Jackson and St. Philip near New Orleans on April 24, 1862, Varuna was rammed twice by the Confederate steamer CSS Governor Moore (formerly known as the Charles Morgan) and eventually sunk. McGowan was stationed at the ship's wheel and showed "the greatest courage and skill" throughout the close-range fight. For this action, he was awarded the Medal of Honor a year later, on April 3, 1863.

McGowan's official Medal of Honor citation reads:

McGowan occupied one of the most responsible positions on the U.S.S. Varuna during the attacks on Forts Jackson and St. Philip and in action against the rebel ship Morgan on 24 April 1862. Although guns were raking the decks from behind him, McGowan remained steadfast at the wheel throughout the thickest of the fight, continuing at his station and rendering service with the greatest courage and skill until his ship, repeatedly holed and twice rammed by the enemy, was beached and sunk.

== See also ==
- List of American Civil War Medal of Honor recipients: M–P
