= Ogle Robert Gowan =

Canadian politician

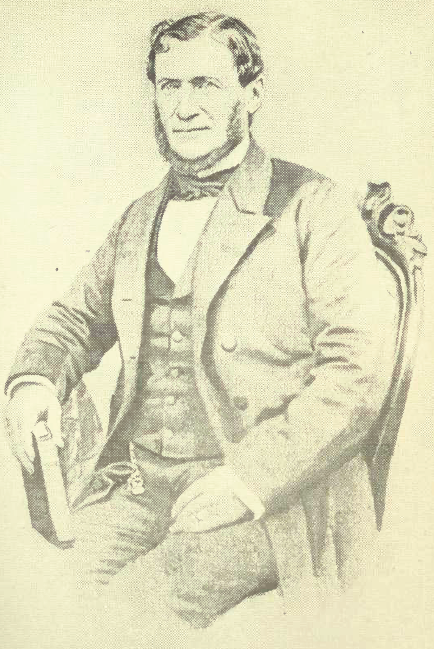
- Born: July 13, 1803; Mount Nebo, County Wexford, Ireland
- Died: August 21, 1876 (aged 73); Toronto, Ontario, Canada

Ogle Robert Gowan (July 13, 1803 – August 21, 1876) was a farmer, Orangeman, journalist and political figure in Upper Canada and Canada West.

He was born in County Wexford, Ireland in 1803, the son of Hunter Gowan, an Orangeman and small landowner and godson of George Ogle, a grand master of the Irish Orange Order. Hunter Gowan led a yeomanry corps known as the "Black Mob" which was accused of committing atrocities against Catholic civilians before and after the outbreak of the Wexford Rebellion; he remains a hate-figure in local nationalist tradition. In 1825, when the Irish Orange lodges were dissolved, Ogle Gowan became assistant secretary for Sir Harcourt Lees' Benevolent and Loyal Orange Institution of Ireland. He arrived in Leeds County, Upper Canada in 1829 and settled in Brockville. In 1830, he called a meeting which formed the Grand Orange Lodge of British North America; Gowan became its deputy grand master and later became Canadian grand master.

Gowan was elected to the Legislative Assembly of Upper Canada for Leeds in 1834 and 1835 but was unseated due to violence at the polls by his Orange supporters. In 1836, he was elected in Leeds; despite his innate distrust of Roman Catholics, he had formed an alliance with Catholic voters to help bolster his support at the polls. In the same year, he founded the Brockville Statesman.

During the Lower Canada Rebellion of 1837, he helped raise a company of volunteers which also fought at the Battle of the Windmill. After the rebellion, Gowan declared his support for responsible government and the division of the clergy reserves among all recognized religious groups in the province. In 1844, he was elected to the 2nd Parliament of the Province of Canada for Leeds and Grenville. In the assembly, he supported John A. Macdonald against the interests of the Family Compact. In 1846, he was replaced by George Benjamin as grand master of the Orange Order in Canada. He helped lead the Orange opposition to the Rebellion Losses Bill in Canada West. In 1849, he stated his support for an elected Legislative Council. In 1852, he moved to Toronto where he served on city council in 1853 and 1854 and took over the publishing of the Toronto Patriot, formerly a Family Compact newspaper. In 1853, he regained the position of grand master, but Benjamin's supporters formed a separate Orange organization. In 1856, Gowan stepped down to allow the rift to be healed under a new grand master, George Lyttleton Allen. He was elected in an 1858 by-election to represent North Leeds and, in 1861, he retired from politics.

Between 1859 and 1860, Gowan produced three volumes of Orangeism, its origin and history, a history of the Orange Order.

He died in Toronto in 1876.
