= R. v Gowan =

1998 Ontario Court of Justice case

R. v Gowan is a March 1998 case tried by the Ontario Court of Justice which ruled that, while a woman being topless as form of protest and free speech is legal, her being topless while she engages in a commercial purpose such as prostitution is illegal.

== Details of the case ==
On June 3, 1997, 31-year-old prostitute J. Gowan took her shirt off and bared her breasts on Montreal Road in the Ontario city of Vanier. Afterwards, Gowan held her breasts, pulled her nipples, and asked nearby car drivers several times if they "want to fuck" her. On two occasions, Gowan did this while she was leaning into other people's cars during a red light. Considering Gowan's behavior—rather than her toplessness itself—to be indecent, Cecile Couture reported Gowan to the authorities.

== Ruling ==
In her ruling, Judge Jennifer Blishen stated that the evidence indicates that the purpose of Gowan's toplessness and provocative behavior was to engage in prostitution and that thus, unlike the actions of Ontario woman Gwen Jacob several years earlier, Gowan's toplessness was commercial in nature. In addition, Blishen stated that she "cannot find that the community would tolerate the use of a woman's bare breasts in public in order to sell any form of service or product" since "[s]uch conduct would appear to promote the objectification of women and the accompanying social harm." Elaborating on this, Blishen wrote that Gowan's actions "portray women in a humiliating manner as sex objects, with the resulting loss of dignity." Thus, Blishen found that Gowan's actions constituted an indecent act in a public place contrary to section 173(1)(a) of the Criminal Code" and that thus Gowan is "guilty as charged." As a result of her conviction for indecent behavior, Gowan was fined $250.

== Criticism ==
In her 2009 book Law's Dream of a Common Knowledge, Mariana Valverde criticized this ruling by arguing that it ensured that "the women who have the best 'lawful excuse,' as law puts it, to go around topless are expressly forbidden from doing so." Elaborating on this, Valverde states that a "new line has been drawn, between the speaking, rational, political woman, who can now bare her breasts even in the presence of unsuspecting children, and the whore of old, who must be covered while outdoors."
