= John McGowan (professor) =

John McGowan (1953-- ) is the John W. and Anna H. Hanes Distinguished Professor of English and Comparative Literature at the University of North Carolina at Chapel Hill. He served as the Director of UNC's Institute for the Arts and Humanities from 2006 to 2014 and the Director of UNC's Graduate School Royster Society of Fellows from 1998 to 2001. His work is situated at the intersection of political philosophy, cultural studies, and literary criticism. He is the author of six books and a co-editor of four more.

McGowan's Postmodernism and its Critics provides a guide to a range of postmodern thinkers (Jacques Derrida, Michel Foucault, Richard Rorty, and Edward Said among others) while also criticizing their anarchistic politics in the name of a robust communitarian understanding of democracy. He pursues that account of democracy in four subsequent books: the first on Hannah Arendt's productive critique of today's diminished understanding of politics; the second on the role of intellectuals in contemporary society; the third his articulation of the principal values and commitments of the "American liberalism" of FDR and John Dewey, and the fourth his return to the pragmatist philosophical tradition to offer the case for liberal democracy. In all these works, he is concerned with how democracy has been understood and in how it has been lived on the ground.

McGowan blogs at his personal website, Public Intelligence.

Current Publications include:

- Pragmatist Politics: Making the Case for Liberal Democracy (2012)
- American Liberalism: An Interpretation of Our Time (2007)
- Democracy's Children: Intellectuals and the Rise of Cultural Politics (2002)
- Co-author of Norton Anthology of Theory and Criticism (2001; 3rd. ed 2017)
- Hannah Arendt: An Introduction (1998)
- Hannah Arendt and the Meaning of Politics (1997)
- Postmodernism and its Critics (1991)
- Representation and Revelation: Victorian Realism from Carlyle to Yeats (1986)
