= John McGowan (footballer) =

Scottish footballer

Personal information
- Full name: John McGowan
- Date of birth: 17 April 1952 (age 74)
- Place of birth: Bellshill, Scotland
- Position: Full back

Youth career
- Glasgow University

Senior career*
Years	Team	Apps	(Gls)
1972–1975	Queen's Park	91	(0)
- * Club domestic league appearances and goals

John McGowan (born 17 April 1952) is a Scottish retired amateur footballer who played in the Scottish League for Queen's Park as a full back.
