= Martin J. McGowan Jr. =

American politician

Marty McGowan

Member of the Minnesota House of Representatives
- In office January 5, 1959 – January 3, 1967
- Preceded by: Alfred I. Johnson
- Succeeded by: Bill Shores
- Constituency: 25th district (1959–1963); 23rd district (1963–1967)

Personal details
- Born: October 28, 1920 Appleton, Minnesota, U.S.
- Died: August 13, 2009 (aged 88) Minneapolis, Minnesota, U.S.
- Party: Democratic–Farmer–Labor
- Spouse: Elizabeth Jane Nolan (m. 1943)
- Education: University of Missouri (BA)
- Occupation: journalist, politician

Martin James McGowan Jr. (October 28, 1920 – August 13, 2009) was an American politician and newspaper editor.

== Early life and education ==
Born in Appleton, Minnesota, McGowan went to the University of Notre Dame from 1938 to 1941 and then received his bachelor's degree from the University of Missouri in 1942.

== Career ==
McGowan was the editor and publisher of the Appleton Press, the Swift County Monitor-News and three other weekly newspapers in Minnesota. The Appleton Press was then a well written and well thought out small town newspaper that reported on the intimate details of local life, such as a visit by a citizen's out of town relative. A selection of his columns spanning those newspapers relate samples of his writing. On the occasion of his 80th birthday, he wrote a biographic article on his life growing up in a local newspaper family, his schooling, working with his father, traveling with the US Navy, and raising a family.

McGowan served on the Blue Earth, Minnesota Planning Commission and the Appleton, Minnesota Library Board. From 1959 until 1967, McGowan served in the Minnesota House of Representatives as a Democrat. His nephew Rick Nolan also served in the Minnesota Legislature and six terms in the U.S. House of Representatives. His son Martin James McGowan III graduated in Mechanical Engineering from the Massachusetts Institute of Technology in 1966. McGowan died in Minneapolis, Minnesota.
