= Stephen McGowan =

Stephen McGowan is the former chief financial officer (CFO) of Sun Microsystems. He retired from this position in June 2006.

McGowan attended Northeastern University where he earned a B.S. in finance, followed by an MBA from Loyola University Chicago. He is also a member of the Institute of Management Accountants and is a Certified Management Accountant.

After joining Sun in 1992, McGowan took on the role of vice president of finance and planning for North America and Australia, and he moved on three years later in 1995 to take on a VP of finance and planning for the company's Worldwide Field Organization in the Computer Systems division. On July 1, 2002, McGowan took on the CFO position from Mike Lehman, leaving his role as vice president of finance, planning and administration for the Global Sales Operations unit. Lehman had served as CFO for four and a half years, having taken on the job in January 1998.

McGowan's previous experience includes various sales, finance and marketing positions at Digital Equipment Corporation.
