= John Curtis Gowan =

American psychologist and academic

John Curtis Gowan (May 21, 1912 – December 2, 1986) was an American psychologist who studied, along with E. Paul Torrance, the development of creative capabilities in children and gifted populations.

== Life ==
Gowan was born May 21, 1912, in Boston, Massachusetts. Graduating from Thayer Academy, Braintree, Massachusetts, in 1929, John Gowan was only 17 when he entered Harvard University, earning his undergraduate degree four years later. A master's degree in mathematics followed; he then moved to Culver, Indiana, where he was employed as a counselor and mathematics teacher at Culver Military Academy from 1941 to 1952. Earning a doctorate from UCLA, he became a member of the founding faculty at the California State University at Northridge, where he taught as a professor of Educational Psychology from 1953 until 1975, when he retired with emeritus status.

Gowan became interested in gifted children after the Russians gained superiority in space with the 1957 launch of Sputnik. He formed the National Association for Gifted Children the following year. He was the group's executive director and president from 1975 to 1979 and over the years wrote more than 100 articles and fourteen books on gifted children, teacher evaluation, child development, and creativity.

While at Northridge, he developed a program to train campus counselors, was nominated in 1973 as an outstanding professor, and had been a counselor, researcher, Fulbright lecturer, and visiting professor at various schools including the University of Singapore, the University of Canterbury in Christchurch, New Zealand, the University of Hawaii, and Connecticut State College. He was a fellow of the American Psychological Association and was also a colleague of the Creative Education Foundation.

Besides his work in Educational Psychology as specifically related to gifted children, he also had an interest in psychic (or psychedelic) phenomena as it relates to human creativity. His work in this area was inspired by the writings of Aldous Huxley and Carl Jung. Based on his work in creativity and with gifted children, Gowan developed a model of mental development that derived from the work of Jean Piaget and Erik Erikson, but also included adult development beyond the ordinary adult successes of career and family building, extending into the emergence and stabilization of extraordinary development and mystical states of consciousness. He described the entire spectrum of available states in his classic Trance, Art, & Creativity (1975), with its different modalities of spiritual and aesthetic expression. He also devised a test for self-actualization, (as defined by Abraham Maslow), called the Northridge Developmental Scale.

Gowan died on December 2, 1986 in Woodland Hills, Los Angeles, California. His adult twin children survived him from his first marriage, John Gowan Jr. of Albany, NY and Ann Gowan Curry, of Anchorage, Alaska as well as seven grandchildren and his second wife Jane Thompson Gowan. His godson, Cameron Scott Matheson sang at his memorial service which was attended by friends and colleagues.

== Works ==
Gowan was the author or coauthor of over 100 articles and fourteen books including:

- Creativity and Its Education Implication - 1967.
- Education of the Ablest - 1971.
- The Guidance of Exceptional Children - 1972.
- The Development of the Creative Individual - 1972.
- Development of the Psychedelic Individual - 1974.
- Trance, Art & Creativity - 1975.
- Operations of Increasing Order - 1980.
- Creativity: Its Educational Implications 2nd Ed. - 1981.
- Enveloped in Glory - 1982.
