= Brian McGowan (footballer) =

Australian rules footballer (1938–2026)

Personal information
- Born: 1 January 1938
- Died: 14 January 2026 (aged 88)
- Original team: Barham
- Height: 165 cm (5 ft 5 in)
- Weight: 72 kg (159 lb)
- Position: Rover

Playing career
Years	Club	Games (Goals)
1955, 1957–1963	South Melbourne	118 (171)
1964–1966	Glenelg	58 (115)

Brian McGowan (1 January 1938 – 14 January 2026) was an Australian rules footballer who played for South Melbourne in the Victorian Football League (VFL).

== Biography ==
McGowan, who hailed from New South Wales, spent his time at South Melbourne roving beside Bob Skilton. He was South Melbourne's second top vote getter in the 1959 Brownlow Medal and finished equal tenth overall. That season he had kicked seven goals in a win over North Melbourne. In 1961 he topped his club's goal-kicking with 38 goals.

The rover finished his career in South Australia where he proved to be a useful player at Glenelg, where he won a 'Best and Fairest' in 1965. The previous year he had been their best forward with 54 goals. He captained Glenelg in 1966, to a wooden spoon, before retiring at the end of the season. He later coached the Glenelg reserves team and ran a luxury car dealership in Adelaide.

McGowan died on 14 January 2026, at the age of 88.

== Sources ==
- Holmesby, Russell and Main, Jim (2007). The Encyclopedia of AFL Footballers. 7th ed. Melbourne: Bas Publishing.
