= John Hunter Gowan II =

Irish loyalist

John Hunter Gowan II (c. 1727 – c. 28 May 1824) commonly known simply as "Hunter Gowan" was an Irish loyalist and leader of a yeomanry corps known as the "Black Mob", which was accused of committing atrocities against Catholic civilians before and after the outbreak of the 1798 rising in Wexford. He remains a hate figure in local nationalist tradition. He was buried on 28 May 1824 in Christ Church, Gorey aged 97 years.

== Family history ==
=== Ancestry ===
John Hunter Gowan II was the son of John Hunter Gowan I (b. 1699 - d. 1779) and Anne Hatton (b. circa 1700). His father was the son of John Gowan (b. 1668) who married the daughter of John Hunter from Co Tipperary resulting in the double-barrelled surname.

John Hunter Gowan I's father, John Gowan, was an officer in King William’s army and bought property in Wexford for his eldest son, John Hunter Gowan I, an attorney. John Hunter Gowan II had one brother, Henry Hatton Gowan (b.1736). Local contribution: John Hunter Gowen is interred in St John's Church, Hollyfort, Gorey, Co Wexford. I am a native of that area, and when young, heard stories of men coming out of a local public house and going up to the church where his body laid in a vault which could be accessed by an open gate. They took out his skull and proceeded to play a game of football around the cemetery, his reputation for deeds of horror on neighbours during 1798, when he was about 72 years old, having stayed in the minds of locals. The story came to the attention of a local vicar, and eventually the vault was sealed (cemented). The spelling always was Gowen. He was a local magistrate and knew all neighbours. This is why he became so hated after the 1798 battle for Irish independence.

=== Wives and family ===
John Hunter Gowan II married Frances Norton in 1771. They had four sons and twelve daughters.

Outside of marriage, Hunter Gowan had children by Margaret Hogan, including another son, Ogle Robert Gowan, who was a prominent Orangeman and a newspaper publisher in Brockville, Kingston and Toronto, Canada; this man was the founder and first Grand Master of the Orange Association, Canada. His home in Canada is now called Nebo Lodge in tribute to his father's Wexford home Mount Nebo.

At the age of sixty-one, Gowan started a relationship with Margaret Hogan, a young local Protestant who was governess for his children. The following is an extract from the somewhat fictionalised biography of his son Ogle Robert Gowan:

Gowan's wife had died six years previously, worn out, as Hunter himself expressed it, like an old ewe from too many birthings. She had served as dam for sixteen of Gowan's children, most of whom had lived, and she had [died], not from any specific disease, but from overuse, and in that respect was far from unique among Irish women of her era.

John Hunter Gowan II had many mistresses and some illegitimate children. There was a lawsuit between Thomas, a legitimate, and illegitimate children William and Ogle.

=== Chronology of progeny ===
- 1771 - Mary GOWAN, d/o John Hunter Gowan & Frances Norton
- 1772 - Anne GOWAN, d/o John Hunter Gowan & Frances Norton; married Richard CHECKLEY of Mayfield, County Cork in Feb, 1805 at Rathfarnham.
- 1773 (d. 1807) Martha GOWAN, d/o John Hunter Gowan & Frances Norton.
- 1774 - Elizabeth GOWAN, d/o John Hunter Gowan & Frances Norton; married Maj. Thomas Fleming and John BUTLER.
- 1776 - Catherine Emma GOWAN, d/o John Hunter Gowan & Frances Norton; married three times to Anthony ORMSBY, Capt. FLEMING and ?? PLIMPTON (once each).
- 1777 - Frances GOWAN, d/o John Hunter Gowan & Frances Norton; married Edward COLES and Richard WILLIAMS.
- 1778 - Jane Amelia GOWAN, d/o John Hunter Gowan & Frances Norton;married Edward Haycock COLCLOUGH-TURNER; their daughter Frances Colclough married Ogle Robert Gowan.
- 1779 - Charlotte GOWAN d/o John Hunter Gowan & Frances Norton, (born at Mount Nebo, a half sister to Ogle Robert Gowan; married first Edward Bacon of Waterford, Ireland and married second George Graham; died in Toronto.
- 1780 - Harriet GOWAN, d/o John Hunter Gowan & Frances Norton; married Thomas QUINLAN.
- 1782 (d. 1821) - Capt. John GOWAN, s/o John Hunter Gowan & Frances Norton. Unmarried but with one son John Gowan IV.
- 1783 (d. 1865) Thomas GOWAN, s/o John Hunter Gowan & Frances Norton; married Ann Brennan.
- 1785 (d. 1833) George GOWAN, s/o John Hunter Gowan & Frances Norton; married Elizabeth HANLON.
- 1786 - Isma GOWAN, d/o John Hunter Gowan & Frances Norton; married ? GILLES and Abraham WEBSTER
- 1788 - Jemima GOWAN, d/o John Hunter Gowan & Frances Norton.
- 1789 (d.1836) Hunter GOWAN, s/o John Hunter Gowan & Frances Norton; married Catherine HARPER and had five sons and a daughter.
- 1791 - Mary GOWAN, d/o John Hunter Gowan & Frances Norton; married Robert HOPKINS, had six sons and a daughter Isma.
- 1800 - William Brainbridge GOWAN, son of John Hunter Gowan and Margaret Hogan.
- 1803 (d. 1876) - Ogle Robert GOWAN, son of John Hunter Gowan and Margaret Hogan, born at Mount Nebo, County Wexford; in 1829 married Frances Anne COLCLOUGH-TURNER (b. circa 1811).
- 1804 - Horatio GOWAN, s/o John Hunter Gowan and Margaret Hogan.
- 1805 - Margaret GOWAN, d/o John Hunter Gowan and Margaret Hogan; married Dr. Charles Buchanan

== Yeomanry leader ==
Hunter Gowan was appointed as leader of a corps of yeoman after a career in enforcing the law of the crown on his locality.

Mr Hunter Gowan had for many years distinguished himself by his activity in apprehending robbers, for which he was rewarded with a pension of £100 per annum, and it were much to be wished that every one who has obtained a pension had as well deserved it. Now exalted to the rank of magistrate, and promoted to be captain of a corps of yeomen, he was zealous in exertions to inspire the people about Gorey with dutiful submission to the magistracy, and a respectful awe of the yeomanry. On a public day in the week preceding the insurrection, the town of Gorey beheld the triumphal entry of Mr Gowan at the head of his corps, with his sword drawn, and a human finger stuck on the point of it. With this trophy he marched into the town, parading up and down the streets several times, so that there was not a person in Gorey who did not witness this exhibition; while in the mean time the triumphant corps displayed all the devices of Orangemen. After the labor and fatigue of the day, Mr Gowan and his men retired to a public-house to refresh themselves, and, like true blades of game, their punch was stirred about with the finger that had graced their ovation, in imitation of keen fox-hunters, who whisk a bowl of punch with the brush of a fox before their boozing commences.

His extreme methods of law enforcement in fact verged on what would in modern parlance be called terrorism. The following excerpt describes one such incident:

It was Hunter Gowan who had the final say regarding the fate of the rebels in the Shillelagh, Carnew and Clonegal area. It was he who ordered De Renzy to shoot six prisoners in the Bay at Clonegal as an example to the other residents of the village of what happened to those who helped the rebels. (Actually we are told that De Renzy managed to save lives of the men by a trick).

== Brutality ==
John Hunter Gowan II was execrated for his brutality as a magistrate and commander of the Wingfield Yeomanry (the "Black Mob") in 1798. The group was responsible for a "reign of terror" on the resident Catholic peasantry in an era of widespread anti-Catholic persecution.

The people of Co Wicklow and north Co Wexford became convinced that they were all going to be slaughtered. This impression was reinforced by the activities of a group of loyalists known as the Black Mob, led by the notorious Hunter Gowan. Men were flogged to death, homes and haggards were burned, suspects were tortured with burning pitch caps, and Hunter Gowan stirred the punch at a local celebration in Gorey with the amputated finger of one of his victims.

Hunter Gowan was eventually brought before the law for his abuses of power though was not convicted.

Annesley Brownrigg, Esq, a magistrate of the county of Wexford, received nine-and-thirty charges of pillage and slaughter against Mr Hunter Gowan, and on the informations being submitted to General Hunter, he sent out a party of the Mid-Lothian cavalry to conduct him prisoner to Wexford, whither he was brought accordingly, and there it was determined to bring him to trial. Mr Brownrigg returned home, in the mean time, to collect the evidence, but it was previously settled that he should have sufficient notice; but on the day appointed for the trial, no prosecutor attending, Mr Gowan of course was discharged. An official letter had been dispatched in due time, yet he did not receive it until it was a day too late. Whether the miscarriage of the letter was by accident or design, continues yet a secret.

== Residence ==
John Hunter Gowan I inherited the estate of Raheencullen (Mount Nebo), near Craanford in north Wexford from his wife Anne Hatton, who was the daughter of Rev Henry Hatton, Rector of nearby Gorey.

According to family records given by James HB Gowan, Thomas Gowan married Ann Brennan at Dublin in 1832 and inherited Mt Nebo, otherwise Rahunacullen, in the Barony of Gorey. Thomas and Ann had no descendants.

"It was later re-christened Mount Saint Benedict as the Benedictines founded a college there where many of our former politicians were educated. The college closed in the early 1920s." It was believed haunted by the ghost of Hunter Gowan, whose spirit was exorcised from the house and fixed into a local field.

Hunter Gowan also owned estates elsewhere in Wexford and Wicklow.

== References in literature ==
- Hunter Gowan is the subject of a poem by Colm Brennan in his collection "Pitchcap and Pike", Dufour 1998, ISBN 1-901233-19-7.
- There are extensive mentions of Hunter Gowan in "History of the Insurrection of the County of Wexford, A. D. 1798" by Edward Hay Read it on Google Books
- The somewhat fictionalised biography of Ogle Robert Gowan gives some vivid descriptions of his father; Harman Akenson, Donald,"The Orangeman: The Life & Times of Ogle Gowan", 1986. ISBN 0-88862-963-X [Read it on Google Books https://books.google.com/books?id=79kicg2JGloC&output=html]
