= John Reid McGowan =

Australian rules footballer and boxer

Jack McGowan
Personal information
- Nickname: Gentleman Jack
- Nationality: Australian
- Born: John Reid McGowan; 4 October 1872 South Melbourne, Australia
- Died: 18 July 1912 (aged 39) Melbourne Australia

Boxing career
- Stance: Orthodox

Boxing record
- Total fights: 112
- Wins: 64
- Win by KO: 28 (25%)
- Losses: 20
- Draws: 22
- No contests: 2

John Reid "Gentleman Jack" McGowan (4 October 1872 – 18 July 1912) was an Australian boxing champion. During his long career in the ring he fought over 110 battles, and was the first fighter to win three Australian titles at different weights, holding the titles of bantam, feather, and light-weight champion of Australia.

== Family ==
McGowan was a first generation Australian and resident of South Melbourne. He was one of six children born to Scottish immigrants William Daniel McGowan and Jane McGowan (née Reid). In 1891 he was married to Mary Josephine Clancy. They had a son and a daughter before Mary died in 1896. In 1902 he married Elizabeth Mary Ellen Dykes and they had one son and three daughters.

== Boxing career ==
McGowan first entered the ring in October 1889, when at Albury he drew with Mick Colles in a 15 rounds match. McGowan won the bantam championship in 1891 be beating George Griffiths. In 1893 was beaten by Nipper Peakes for the feather-weight championship. On the retirement of Peakes, McGowan fought Harry Perry for the championship, and won in 14 rounds.

In 1894 began the sequence of four memorable fights between McGowan and Tim Hegarty for the championship. They met four times. In the first three battles (each 20 rounds) Hegarty won on points. The fourth, of 20 rounds, resulted in a draw, it having been agreed that if both were on their feet to draw the stakes.

In 1896 Jack Marshall took McGowan to South Africa. There he beat Holloway for the light-weight championship of the country in four rounds, and Jimmy Murphy in 15 rounds.

In 1899 McGowan beat George Atkinson in three battles of 15, 20 and 51 rounds. He later encountered a boxer named Tom Mitchell at the Melbourne Democratic Club. Mitchell weighed over 11 st to McGowan's 9 st 4 lb, McGowan stayed the limit but the verdict went against him.

In 1904 McGowan fought Tasmanian lightweight champion Billy Maher in Ballarat. McGowan broke his arm in the 8th round but fought on till police intervened and stopped the fight in round 11. The referee declared the fight a draw.

McGowan was out of commission for a number of years, having turned his attention entirely to instruction of pupils at the Melbourne Athletic Club and University of Melbourne Athletic Club. He came back after a few years and fought Bob Greenshields in 1909 to win the lightweight championship of Australia.

McGowan was at one stage a boxing pupil of "The Black Diamond" Jack Dowridge, a Barbadian immigrant who pioneered boxing in Brisbane, Australia. Among Dowridge's other pupils was "The Black Prince" Peter Jackson.

McGowan was inducted into the Australian National Boxing Hall of Fame (ANBHOF) in 2008.

== Bland Holt Dramatic Company ==
Another source of income for McGowan when not boxing was appearing and touring with the Bland Holt Dramatic Company. He would take part in novelty sporting exhibitions which were written into the plays. In Sporting Life he gave demonstrations of scientific boxing with another lightweight, played on at least one occasion by his brother Archibald McGowan, an amateur lightweight champion himself.

== Australian rules football ==
When boxing commitments allowed, McGowan played Australian rules football with VFA club South Melbourne (Now known as the Sydney Swans) during the club's successful late 1880s to mid 1890s period, including at least one Premiership team in 1890.

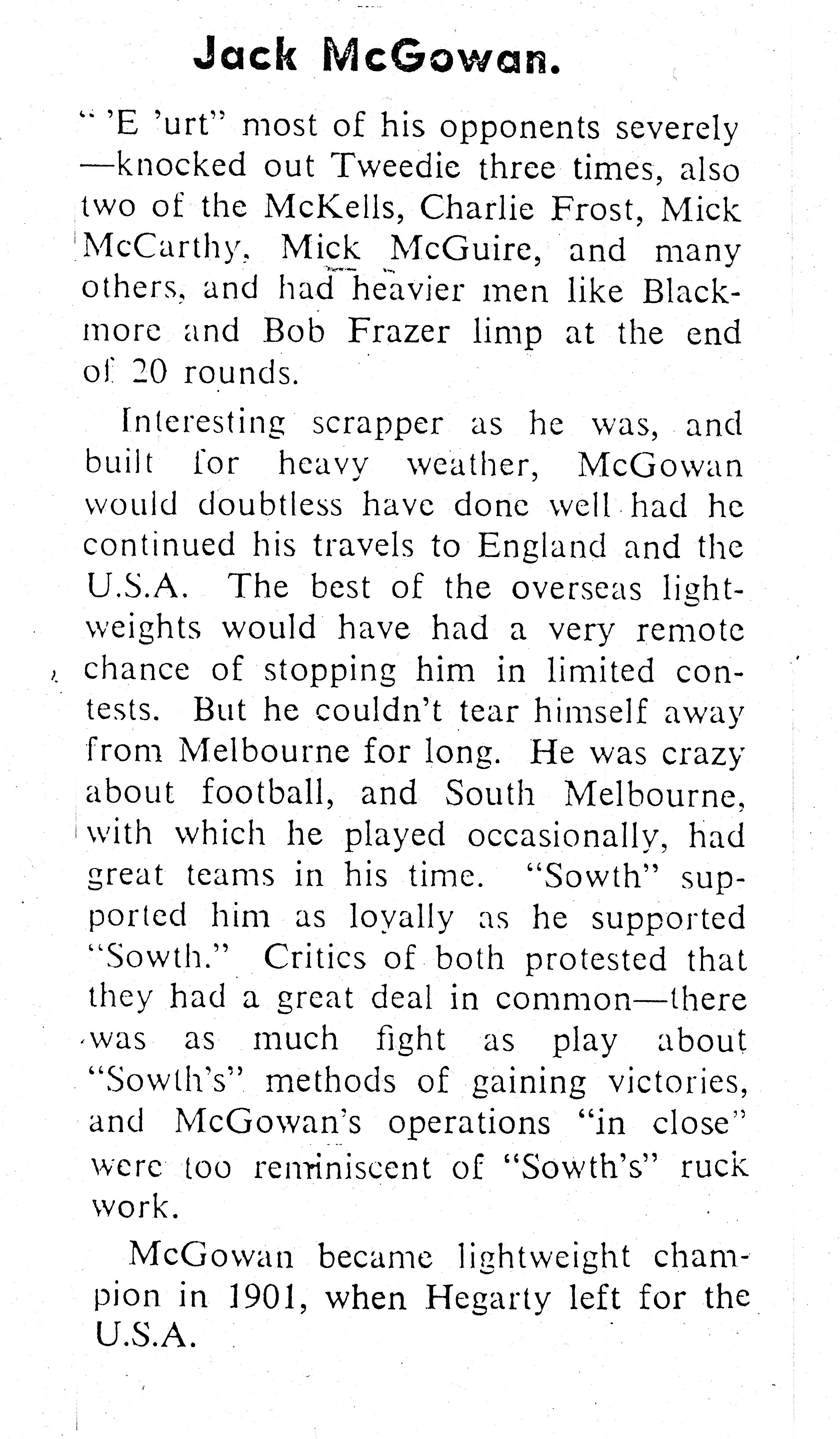
Extract from The Bulletin, Wednesday 26 May 1936

== Death ==
McGowan died from a cerebral haemorrhage in the Melbourne Hospital after collapsing while sparring with a pupil at the Melbourne Athletic Club.

Two weeks earlier he had sustained slight concussion of the brain by colliding with one of his pupils and had been advised to rest.

He is buried at Melbourne General Cemetery.

McGowan Street, Southbank, Victoria (Formerly South Melbourne) is named in his honour.
