= Computer supported brainstorming =

Concept Mapping for Group Decision Support Systems

In computer supported brainstorming, team members contribute their ideas through electronic means either synchronously or asynchronously. The brainstorming software selected by the team mediates the individual interactions and helps to organize and shape the products of the brainstorming session. Computer supported brainstorming can be implemented using a wide variety of electronic technologies.

== Overview ==
In traditional group brainstorming all members of a team are present in the same physical location and their interaction is defined by a selected protocol. Proponents such as Gallupe et al. argue that electronic brainstorming eliminates many of the problems of standard brainstorming, including production blocking (i.e. group members must take turns to express their ideas) and evaluation apprehension (i.e. fear of being judged by others).

== History ==
Brainstorming exists in many forms, but first began to be formalized in graphical representation known as "concept mapping" by Joseph D. Novak of Cornell University in the 1970s. Concept mapping involved collecting and organizing information in a hierarchical fashion.

Seth Hollander, then a student at the Thayer School of Engineering of Dartmouth College in Hanover, New Hampshire, is said to be the first individual to formally propose the use of computers to assist with brainstorming and concept mapping. In his Master of Science thesis "Computer-Assisted Creativity and the Policy Process", Hollander suggested an "interactive computer program designed to enhance creative thinking". One year later, in 1985, The Idea Generator, the first software for computer supported brainstorming, became publicly available.

In 1991 both GroupSystems at the University of Arizona and the Software Aided Meeting Management (SAMM) system at the University of Minnesota took advantage of emerging computer networking technology installed in rooms dedicated to computer supported meetings. When using these electronic meeting systems (EMS, as they came to be called), group members simultaneously and independently entered ideas into a computer terminal. The software collected (or "pooled") the ideas into a list, which could then be displayed on a central screen (anonymously if desired). Researchers found that the use of such computer supported systems helped groups categorize ideas, eliminate duplicates, and promote assessment and discussion of prioritized or controversial issues.

== Available technologies and applications ==
Numerous software platforms have been designed for computer supported brainstorming, each of which has advantages and disadvantages over traditional brainstorming depending on the specific circumstances. The features of these software titles are similar in that they:

- Allow real-time updates
- Allow groups to download or print final versions
- Allow color coding information
- Identify information with the user who submitted it
- Allow maps to be reorganized and restructured by the group
- Offer templates for different types of interaction

Collaborative brainstorming software can be used in a number of ways. It could be used in place of the traditional note card method of outlining an essay, or to make a big concept more understandable, to visualize the scope of a marketing campaign, or to organize interview notes.

Following are several examples of business use cited by Social Signal, a social media blog:

- Plan and outline writing projects
- Wireframe the navigation structure for a website
- Outline a community engagement plan
- Diagram an organization chart and decision tree
- Map out deliverables for a complex project
- Figure out the relationship among multiple overlapping technical terms
- Map out responsibilities on a complex project

=== Future technology: virtual worlds and avatars ===
As technology has advanced, so have computer supported brainstorming systems. Now some web-based brainstorming systems allow contributors to post their comments anonymously through the use of avatars. This technique also allows users to log on over an extended time period, typically one or two weeks, to allow participants some "soak time" before posting their ideas and feedback. This technique has been used particularly in the field of new product development, but can be applied in any number of areas requiring collection and evaluation of ideas.

Globalization and rapid technological advances have spurred multi-national companies to use virtual worlds and avatars to connect with each other and with consumers. Avatars and virtual worlds are a unique web-based combination of verbal, non-verbal and written communication without physical limitations such as space and geographic location. Virtual environments provide a context for collaboration that is "media-rich... allowing direct and real-time interaction between companies and users". Research shows that team idea generation and individual cognition in virtual environments increases in creative visual work spaces.

International companies such as IBM and Coca-Cola have used virtual worlds such as Second Life to collaborate with avatars for new product development. In May 2007, Coca-Cola sponsored a contest for residents of Second Life to design a virtual vending machine that would not dispense Coca-Cola but provide a refreshing and invigorating experience. Although Coca-Cola gave residents a prototype, participants were given complete creative freedom. In addition to business and market collaboration, over 200 universities use Second Life for educational conferences and collaborative work. Avatars and the virtual world allow brainstorming that is visual, synchronous or asynchronous, anonymous and in different locations.

== Benefits ==
=== Group size ===
The advantage of computer supported brainstorming over traditional brainstorming has been shown to be greatest with larger groups. Computer supported brainstorming was not beneficial for small groups, likely because the limited number of participants eliminated the evaluation apprehension and production blocking capabilities of the electronic system.

=== Anonymity ===
The major benefits of computer supported brainstorming software arises from the anonymity of participants, the archiving of data, elimination of wait time for turn taking and the ability to incorporate additional feedback tools to reduce social loafing.

=== Electronic archives ===
Another advantage of computer supported brainstorming software is that all ideas can be archived electronically in their original form, and then retrieved later for further thought and discussion. [15] The archiving of data for later review can also stimulate creativity as ideas are revisited and refined over time.

=== Revision ===
The ability to review and revise the ideas of others is also an advantage of the elimination of wait time in computer supported brainstorming software. Some software programs show all ideas as they are generated (via chat room or e-mail). The display of ideas may cognitively stimulate brainstorm participants, as their attention is kept on the flow of ideas being generated without the potential distraction of social cues such as facial expressions and verbal language.

=== Increased focus ===
Early researchers into computer supported brainstorming expressed concern that the simultaneous contribution of multiple ideas would cause information overload and reduce productivity. Studies show that computer supported brainstorming can actually help increase focus, thus increasing effectiveness of virtual sessions over in-person brainstorming.

=== Color coding ===
Color coding features of some computer supported brainstorming software can help mitigate the potential for information overload and differentiate between individual contributions. The use of color coding has been shown to reduce confusion arising from simultaneous contribution of ideas as well as increasing motivation for contribution, as the ideas of each individual team member can be easily identified.

=== Increased idea production ===
Computer supported brainstorming techniques have been shown to produce more ideas and help individuals focus their attention on the ideas of others better than a brain writing technique (participants write individual written notes in silence and then subsequently communicate them with the group). The production of more ideas has been linked to the fact that paying attention to others' ideas leads to non-redundancy, as brainstormer participants try to avoid replicating or repeating another participant's comment or idea.

In a study by Cooper, et al. authors found some evidence that more controversial ideas were produced by members of anonymous computer supported groups than by members of the other groups. The authors also found clear evidence that anonymous brainstorming groups produced more non-redundant ideas than did non-anonymous brainstorming groups.

=== Reduction of social loafing ===
Some computer supported brainstorming software now includes a social comparison tracking component to help reduce social loafing. Social loafing is when people exert less effort working collectively compared to working individually. Shepherd et al. found that including a social comparison tracker into brainstorming systems increased the output of a group using computer supported brainstorming by 23% as compared to a control group using computer supported brainstorming with no social comparison.

== Limitations ==
The perceived effectiveness of computer brainstorming software is mediated by the ease of use of the technology. In comparing the results of several studies, researchers found that when software was perceived to be difficult to use, students preferred to collaborate face-to-face using a whiteboard. When software was perceived as being easy to use, students preferred the online environment.

=== Loss of productivity ===
Electronic brainstorming can cause a loss of productivity when group members become highly focused on their own work, or the work of others, instead of finding a productivity balance. The ideas listed on group members' screens can lead other members to spend too much time reading others' ideas instead of entering their own ideas. This occurs most often during synchronous idea generation which can prevent an individual from paying attention to others' contributions when he or she is formulating his or her own ideas. When members are trying to create original ideas, they can become overly focused on not duplicating ideas that they are unable to come up with their own.

=== Greater cognitive load ===
Electronic brainstorming has the ability to help group members spur new ideas when exposed to the ideas generated by others. However, when compared with non-electronic brainstorming, electronic brainstorming actually forces group members to spend additional time and cognitive resources reading, understanding, and interpreting ideas instead of coming up with new ideas of their own, creating a greater cognitive load that can increase time needed for brainstorming.

=== Need for leadership ===
Even when technology is in place to help facilitators guide electronic brainstorming, there is still a need for leadership. While the use of the does advance the effective use of groups, technology does not replace the need for group leadership. However, when related to group size, electronic brainstorming is superior to traditional verbal brainstorming for large groups.

== See also ==
- Chief idea officer
- Mind maps
- Forecasting
- Disney method
- Affinity diagram
- 6-3-5 Brainwriting
- Futures techniques
- Creativity techniques
- Nominal group technique
- International Futures Forum
- Multiple-criteria decision analysis
- Hawaii International Conference on System Sciences
