= Advanced Innovation Design Approach =

Advanced Innovation Design Approach (AIDA) is a holistic approach for enhancing the innovative and competitive capabilities of industrial companies. The name Advanced Innovation Design Approach (AIDA) was proposed in the research project "Innovation Process 4.0" run at the University of Applied Sciences Offenburg, Germany in co-operation with 10 German industrial companies in 2015–2019. AIDA can be considered as a pioneering mindset, an individually adaptable range of strong innovation techniques such as comprehensive front-end innovation process, advanced innovation methods, best tools and methods of the theory of inventive problem solving TRIZ, organisational measures for accelerating innovation, IT-solutions for Computer-Aided Innovation, and other tools for new product development, elaborated in the recent decade in the industry and academia.

Initially the AIDA has been conceptualised as a systemic approach including analysis, optimizations and further development of the innovation process and promoting the innovation climate in industrial companies. The innovation process with self-configuration, self-optimization, self-diagnostics and intelligent information processing and communication, is understood as a holistic system comprising the following typical phases with feedback loops and simultaneous auxiliary or follow-up processes: uncovering of solution-neutral customer needs, technology and market trends, identification of the needs and problems with high market potential and formulation of the innovation tasks and strategy, systematic idea generation and problem solving, evaluation and enhancement of solution ideas, creation of innovation concepts based on solution ideas, evaluation of the innovation concepts as well as implementation, validation and market launch of chosen innovation concepts.
The Advanced Innovation Design Approach was refined and further developed for the application in the field of process engineering in the context of the EU research project "Intensified by Design - Platform for the intensification of processes involving solids handling” within international consortium of 22 universities, research institutes and industrial companies under H2020 SPIRE programme. In 2020 the European Commission has placed AIDA on its Innovation Radar as innovation with the high market potential.

== Principle of completeness ==
As a holistic innovation approach, AIDA postulates the complete problem analysis and a comprehensive idea generation and problem solving. The problems faced by the industry can not be solved by single eureka idea. The principle of completeness in the new product development can be illustrated by following 4 steps.

1. Initial complex problem must be segmented into the partial problems. The problem ranking method helps to identify problems crucial for innovation success.
2. The strongest TRIZ inventive principles replace the random brainstorming, increasing the quality and quantity of ideas within a short period of time. For each partial problem several ideas must be generated. No relevant idea should be overlooked or lost.
3. The complementary solution ideas are combined to the solution concepts. A robust solution concept delivers solutions for all partial problems.
4. The solution concepts often have their secondary side effects, like costs, risks or R&D expenditures, which must be limited through concept optimization.

Another example demonstrates the principle of completeness in the phase of the innovation strategy formulation. For the complete identification of existing and future customer needs or benefits several complementary methods are used simultaneously (Tool 4. Innovation potential analysis):

- Voice-of-the-Customer Methods, e.g. Lead User identification or web-based monitoring.
- Analysis of the customer working process (Process Mapping)
- Prediction of the customer needs.
- Analysis of system functions, and Identification of the new product features and innovation tasks from the patent literature.
- Analysis of market and technological trends, and others.

== AIDA innovation tools ==
AIDA tools or apps most frequently used in the practice include:

1. Brainstorming 40x40: Generate 40 ideas with enhanced 40 TRIZ Inventive Principles (incl. 160 inventive sub-principles, 2017).
2. Inno-Workshop: Tool for systematic problem solving and moderation of innovation workshops with TRIZ.
3. TRIZ Inventor: Solving of bottle-neck problems with inventive algorithm ARIZ in its short form.
4. Innovation potential analysis: comprehensive identification of innovation opportunities, customer benefits and segments with high market potential.
5. New concept development: implementation of the selected innovation tasks (tool 04) into new concepts with high market potential.
6. Root-conflict analysis and anticipatory failure identification: tool for elimination harmful effects.
7. Systematic and creative cost cutting: for products and processes.
8. InnoMonitor: tool for continuous monitoring of innovative capability of companies (80 parameters and 10 key performance indicators).
9. Database of 200+ best practice measures for enhancement of innovation capability.
10. Rapid Cross Industry Innovation: an easy-to-use method for fast idea generation with the help of analogies and similarity rules (2019).
11. AIDA Automatic Idea & IP Generator: a new app for fast and complete automatic idea generation based on 200 inventive principles (2020-23), tuned for applying ChatGPT or other GAI-tools.

== Advanced Innovation Design Methods ==
The new Advanced Innovation Methods are the basis for the further development of the AIDA-tools or apps. The following list will be regularly updated:

- Advanced Design (2014) - Methods for the early stage of the innovation process, proposed by the research team of the Politecnico di Milano, Italy.
- Advanced design methods for successful innovation (2013) - new methods in the industrial design from the Dutch research platform Design United, Delft University of Technology
- Root Conflict Analysis RCA+ (2011) - universal method for comprehensive problem and contradiction analysis.
- The Business Model Navigator (2014) - engineering method for systematic business model innovation, containing 55 business models for creative copying and recombination. University of St. Gallen.
- New Product Blueprinting (2012) - The Advanced Innovation and Marketing (AIM) Institute.
