= Ideation (creative process) =

Creative process of generating, developing, and communicating new ideas

Ideation is the creative process of generating, developing, and communicating new ideas, where an idea is understood as a basic unit of thought that can be either visual, concrete, or abstract. Ideation comprises all stages of a thought cycle, from innovation, to development, to actualization. Ideation can be conducted by individuals, organizations, or crowds. As such, it is an essential part of the design process, both in education and practice.

== Criticism ==
The word "ideation" has come under informal criticism as being a term of meaningless jargon, as well as being inappropriately similar to the psychiatric term for suicidal ideation.

== Methods and approaches ==
There are many methods and approaches for ideation. A list of common ideation techniques is as follows:

- Brainstorming: A technique where the basic premise is to get a group together and have them share their ideas freely, without judgement. The goal is to generate as many ideas as possible, regardless of whether they are good or bad. Once the brainstorming session is over, the group can evaluate the ideas and narrow them down to the best ones.
- Idea mapping: This process begins with brainstorming a central idea and then developing said idea by adding related concepts and details. The result is a map or diagram that visually captures the relationships between ideas. This technique can be used individually and in groups, and it is an effective way to generate a large volume of ideas quickly. Idea mapping is often used in business, engineering, and design, where creativity is essential for success.
- SCAMPER: SCAMPER is an acronym for the seven different aspects of ideation around which this idea revolves: Substitute, Combine, Adapt, Modify, Put to other uses, Eliminate, and Reverse. By considering each of these elements, in turn, it is possible to develop new ways to approach a problem or challenge and obtain a wide range of ideas suitable for further development.
- The 5 Whys technique: The 5 Whys technique is a simple yet powerful tool for driving to the root cause of a problem. The basis of the technique is to ask "why" five times to identify the primary causal factor behind a particular issue. It is suitable for a range of problem complexities and is often used in conjunction with other root cause analysis tools, such as fishbone diagrams and cause-and-effect tables. Although it may seem simplistic, the 5 Whys can be an invaluable tool for uncovering hidden problems and generating new ideas.
- Pugh matrix
- Morphological analysis
- 6 thinking hats
- The method of loci: The method of loci is a strategy for memorizing new information. It is a mnemonic device that involves the visualization of placing pieces of information around a room and then visualizing yourself "picking the information up". This method is known as memory palace. The word loci is the plural of "locus", which means location.
- Bodystorming: Bodystorming is a creative process that involves using the body to simulate various actions and explore different solutions to a problem. The term was coined by Gijs van Wulfen, who developed the process as a way to overcome the limits of traditional brainstorming. With bodystorming, participants are encouraged to physically act out possible solutions to a problem, allowing for a more immersive and realistic exploration of potential solutions. The process can be used alone or in groups, and is often used in conjunction with other ideation techniques such as role-playing and mind mapping. Bodystorming is an effective way to generate new ideas, and has been used in a variety of fields including product design, architecture, and marketing.
- Brainwriting

== See also ==
- Creativity
  - Creativity techniques
- Chief idea officer
- Enterprise social software
- Decision tree
- Originality
