= Contextual inquiry =

Design research method

Contextual inquiry (CI) is a user-centered design (UCD) research method, part of the contextual design methodology. A contextual inquiry interview is usually structured as an approximately two-hour, one-on-one interaction in which the researcher watches the user in the course of the user's normal activities and discusses those activities with the user.

== Description ==
Contextual inquiry defines four principles to guide the interaction:

- Context—Interviews are conducted in the user's actual workplace. The researcher watches users do their own work tasks and discusses any artifacts they generate or use with them. In addition, the researcher gathers detailed re-tellings of specific past events when they are relevant to the project focus.
- Partnership—User and researcher collaborate to understand the user's work. The interview alternates between observing the user as he or she works and discussing what the user did and why.
- Interpretation—The researcher shares interpretations and insights with the user during the interview. The user may expand or correct the researcher's understanding.
- Focus—The researcher steers the interaction towards topics which are relevant to the team's scope.

If specific tasks are important, the user may be asked to perform those tasks.

A contextual interview generally has three phases, which may not be formally separated in the interview itself:

- The introduction—The researcher introduces him or herself and may request permission to record and start recording. The researcher promises confidentiality to the user, solicits a high-level overview of the user's work, and consults with the user on the specific tasks the user will work on during the interview.
- The body of the interview—The researcher observes the work and discusses the observations with the user. The researcher takes notes, usually handwritten, of everything that happens.
- The wrap-up—The researcher summarizes what was gleaned from the interview, offering the user a chance to give final corrections and clarifications.

Before a contextual inquiry, user visits must be set up. The users selected must be doing work of interest currently, must be able to have the researcher come into their workplace (wherever it is), and should represent a wide range of different types of users. A contextual inquiry may gather data from as few as 4 users (for a single, small task) to 30 or more.

Following a contextual inquiry field interview, the method defines interpretation sessions as a way to analyze the data. In an interpretation session, 3-8 team members gather to hear the researcher re-tell the story of the interview in order. As the interview is re-told, the team add individual insights and facts as notes. They also may capture representations of the user's activities as work models (defined in the Contextual design methodology). The notes may be organized using an affinity diagram. Many teams use the contextual data to generate in-depth personas.

Contextual inquiries may be conducted to understand the needs of a market and to scope the opportunities. They may be conducted to understand the work of specific roles or tasks, to learn the responsibilities and structure of the role. Or they may be narrowly focused on specific tasks, to learn the details necessary to support that task.

== Advantages ==
Contextual inquiry offers the following advantages over other customer research methods:

- The open-ended nature of the interaction makes it possible to reveal tacit knowledge, knowledge about their own work process that users themselves are not consciously aware of. Tacit knowledge has traditionally been very hard for researchers to uncover.
- The information produced by contextual inquiry is highly reliable. Surveys and questionnaires assume the questions they include are important. Traditional usability tests assume the tasks the user is asked to perform are relevant. Contextual inquiries focus on the work users need to accomplish, done their way—so it is always relevant to the user. And because it's their own work, the users are more committed to it than they would be to a sample task.
- The information produced by contextual inquiry is highly detailed. Marketing methods such as surveys produce high-level information but not the detailed work practice data needed to design products. It is very difficult to get this level of detail any other way.
- Contextual inquiry is a very flexible technique. Contextual inquiries have been conducted in homes, offices, hospital OPDs, operating theaters, automobiles, factory floors, construction sites, maintenance tunnels, and chip fabrication labs, among many other places.

== Limitations ==
Contextual inquiry has the following limitations:

- Contextual inquiry is resource-intensive. It requires travel to the informant's site, a few hours with each user, and then a few more hours to interpret the results of the interview.

== History of the method ==
Contextual inquiry was first referenced as a "phenomenological research method" in a paper by Whiteside, Bennet, and Holtzblatt in 1988, which lays out much of the justification for using qualitative research methods in design. It was first fully described as a method in its own right by Wixon, Holtzblatt, and Knox in 1990, where comparisons with other research methods are offered. It is most fully described by Holtzblatt and Beyer in 1995.

Contextual inquiry was extended to the full contextual design methodology by Beyer and Holtzblatt between 1988 and 1992. Contextual design was briefly described by them for Communications of the ACM in 1995, and was fully described in Contextual Design in 1997.

Work models as a way of capturing representations of user work during interpretation sessions were first briefly described by Beyer and Holtzblatt in 1993 and then more fully in 1995.

== See also ==
- Design research
- Ethnography
- Scenario
