= Carl Flink =

American choreographer

- Occupations: Choreographer, dancer, director and academic
- Title: Nadine Jette Sween Professor of Dance; Black Label Movement Artistic Director

Academic background
- Education: University of Minnesota (BA); Stanford Law School (JD)

Carl Flink is an American lawyer and dancer. He is the founder and artistic director of Black Label Movement, a contemporary dance company based in Minneapolis. He is also the Nadine Jette Sween Professor of Dance and director of the dance program at University of Minnesota. Flink was a member of the Jose Limón Dance Company from 1992 to 1998, among other NYC based dance companies including Creach/Koester Men Dancing, Janis Brenner & Dancers, and Nina Winthrop & Dancers. He has been a frequent guest artist with Shapiro & Smith Dance.

Flink's work is focused in choreography, theatrical movement direction, contemporary dance and partnering technique, and dance/science collaborations. His work as a dancer, choreographer and director has been featured in the media numerous times.

== Education ==
Flink graduated in Political Science and Women's Studies from University of Minnesota's College of Liberal Arts in 1990. He then earned his Juris Doctor from Stanford Law School in 2001, where he was a Public Interest Law Fellow and a Skadden Fellowship Alternate.

== Career ==
Flink's work is focused in choreography, movement and performance direction in theater and dance and collaborations between science and dance. Over the past decade his creative work has expanded to include multiple TED Talks, music videos and other internet and film content. Upon completing his bachelor's degree he moved to New York City, where he joined the José Limón Dance Company from 1992 to 1998, in addition he worked with Paul Taylor, Creach/Koester Men Dancing, Janis Brenner & Dancers and Joanna Mendl Shaw, among others. In 1998, he attended Stanford Law School where he also served as a guest lecturer with the Stanford University Dance Division until graduation in 2001. In 2001, he joined Farmers’ Legal Action Group, Inc. as a staff attorney and also the University of Minnesota Dance Program as an affiliate instructor. In 2005, he joined the dance program as the Endowed Nadine Jette Sween Professor of Dance. He was appointed as an associate professor at the university in 2004 and was promoted to professor in 2017. Flink chaired the University's Theatre Arts & Dance Department from 2008 till 2014 and was appointed as director of the Dance Program from 2005 – 2008 and 2017 - present.

Flink is the artistic director of Black Label Movement, which he founded in Minneapolis.

Since 2009, he has worked with University of Minnesota biomedical engineering professor David Odde in a collaboration called The Moving Cell Project (Moving Cell). Through Moving Cell, Flink and Odde created their bodystorming rapid modeling system that uses choreographic strategies, human bodies and space to rapid model scientific research.

== Reception ==
=== Dance performance ===
As a dance performer, Flink garnered significant critical feedback, particularly during his 8-year career with the Limón Dance Company. His Paul Taylor’s "Epic" (1957) was reviewed by Jennifer Dunning as "there is a stringent, acerbic freshness and drive to Epic, filled as it is with shocking eruptions of something other than stillness in that chill, still landscape." He also performed Daniel Nagrin's Strange Hero, reviewed by Anna Kisselgoff in 1994 as "Mr. Flink enters with total cool… Mr. Flink, superbly weighted and square in his movement, suddenly unleashes the dynamic spurts that tell the strange hero's story. A sudden drop into a plie, a slide to the floor and a spring or a series of incredibly fluid falls recount a furtive existence covered up by surface bravado."

Writing about his performance in José Limón's Missa Brevis (1958) and The Winged (1966) Anna Kisselgoff wrote in 1997 that "Daniel Charon, Carl Flink and Francisco Ruvalcaba exemplified an intensity that was expanded into the passionate performance of the entire cast. Mr. Flink and Mr. Ruvalcaba, a young newcomer, are outstanding dancers, and they saved The Winged.

=== Concert dance ===
Flink has worked as artistic director of Black Label Movement and as an independent choreographer for dance. He choreographed Wreck, an evening length work, which premiered in January 2008. It was favorably reviewed by Dance Magazine.

=== Theatrical productions ===
Flink began his professional career as a director of movement for theater in 2009. Mary’s Wedding (2009) – The Jungle Theater's production of Stephen Massicote's Mary's Wedding directed by Joel Sass was Flink's premiere theatrical production. Flink made his directorial debut in collaboration with Twin Cities theater artist Luverne Seifert in their theater production of Büchner's Woyzeck, Te Woyzeck Project. In 2012, he directed Spring Awakening: The Musical and made his musical theater debut as a choreographer for Theater Latté Da's production of Spring Awakening: The Musical directed by Peter Rothstein.

Flink was the movement coordinator for Theater Latte's Da's production of Sondheim's Sweeney Todd: The Demon Barber of Fleet Street in 2015. The production topped the Twin Cities Star Tribune's list of top theater productions for 2015. He was the director of movement for the Guthrie Theater's production of Shakespeare's Twelfth Night directed by Thomas Quaintance.

=== The Moving Cell Project ===
Since 2009, Flink has been in regular collaboration with University of Minnesota biomedical engineer David Odde through their Moving Cell Project. This collaboration has led to the development of their Bodystorming System, a rapid modeling system that employs choreographic strategies, human bodies and space to develop models for scientific research. Bodystorming has been the subject of a Science Magazine article, an invited essay in Trends in Cellular Biology, a 2013 TEDMED Talk and a Twin Cities Public Television Minnesota Original segment.

=== Television and video ===
Flink's work has also been featured in television and video projects, including: TPT MNO Duet for Wreck (2012) – A Twin Cities Public Television Minnesota Original segment that received a 2012 Regional Emmy Award. The video features a duet choreographed by Flink that he performed with his wife Emilie Plauché Flink. The work features an original composition by composer Mary Ellen Childs.

== Awards and honors ==
- 2008 - McKnight Artist Fellowship for Choreography
- 2010 - Twin Cities Star Tribune Top 5 Best Theatre Production The Woyzeck Project
- 2012 - Upper Midwest Regional Emmy Award for Twin Cities Public Television's MN Original episode featuring “Duet for Wreck”
- 2012 - Twin Cities City Pages Artist of the Year
- 2012 - Twin Cities City Pages Best Choreographer
- 2012 - McKnight Artist Fellowship for Choreography
- 2012 - Minnesota Ivey Award for Overall Excellence of Production “Spring Awakening: The Musical”
- 2013-2014 - Arthur "Red" Motley Exemplary Teacher Award, University of Minnesota College of Liberal Arts
- 2014 - Sage Award for Dance - Outstanding Ensemble Black Label Movement
- 2015 - Twin Cities Star Tribune #1 Best Theatre Production for “Sweeney Todd: The Musical”
- 2015 - Twin Cities Star Tribune #5 Best Theatre Production for The Crucible at the Guthrie Theater named #2 on Lavender Magazine's Best Theater Productions of 2015
- 2016 - Two Upper Midwest Regional Emmy Award Nominations for TPT's TV Takeover Black Label Movement
- 2016 - SAGE Award Nomination for Outstanding Choreography
- 2020 - Dean's Medalist, University of Minnesota College of Liberals Arts
- 2022 - Map Fund Award
