= Ruth Noller =

Ruth B. Noller (October 6, 1922 – June 3, 2008) from Sarasota, formerly of Buffalo, is known for her work as a scholar in creative studies. Noller was a Navy veteran of World War II, mathematician, and Distinguished Service Professor Emeritus at State University of New York. Her articles and publications include "Mentoring: A Voiced Scarf, Scratching the Surface of Creative Problem Solving" and with Sid Parnes, "The Guide to Creative Action and Creative Action Book."

== Mathematical formula for creativity ==
Noller applied her background as a former professor of mathematics to develop a formula describing the factors that produce creative behavior. In her formula, represented as C = ƒa(KIE), she indicated that creativity is generated by the interaction between Knowledge (K), Imagination (I), and Evaluation (E). Furthermore, she suggested that a crucial catalyst in this formula is the individual's attitude (A).

In 2015, the Creative Education Foundation announced the Ruth B. Noller Research Grant for emerging research in the field of creativity.
