= Min Basadur =

Canadian academic

Marino (Min) Sidney Basadur
- Born: 1939 (age 86–87); Kirkland Lake, Ontario
- Education: University Of Toronto, Xavier University, University Of Cincinnati
- Occupations: Founder of Center for Research and Applied Creativity, President of Basadur Applied Creativity, Professor Emeritus of Organizational Behavior and Innovation at McMaster University's Michael G. DeGroote School of Business
- Known for: Patented Simplexity Thinking System and Basadur Creative Problem Solving Profile
- Website: www.basadur.com

Marino (Min) Sidney Basadur is a teacher, consultant, author and researcher best known for his work in applied creativity including the Basadur Creative Problem Solving Profile (CPSP) and the Simplexity Thinking System for improving workplace innovation & creativity. He is founder of Basadur Applied Innovation and professor emeritus of organizational behavior at McMaster University's Michael G. DeGroote School of Business. During his years as a professor of organizational behaviour at McMaster University, Dr. Basadur conducted original research that led to the development of innovative methods and technologies. McMaster’s Industry Liaison Office (MILO) supports the dissemination of these technologies to academic and commercial partners.

== Early life ==
Basadur was born in Kirkland Lake, Ontario, and grew up in Toronto, where he attended Humberside Collegiate and played baseball, basketball and football. He graduated from the University of Toronto with a degree in engineering physics in 1961.

== Career ==
Basadur was hired by Procter & Gamble in Hamilton, Ontario and then transferred to the company's research and development headquarters in Cincinnati in 1967. He received three U.S patents for his work there and brought several new industrial products to market.

While employed in Cincinnati, Basadur became acquainted with the teachings of Sid Parnes, who became a lifetime friend and colleague. Sid was a creativity researcher and teacher at the Creative Problem Solving Institute (CPSI) in Buffalo, New York founded by Alex Osborn. Building on the teachings of Parnes, Osborn and other's at CPSI, Basadur expanded on these methods within Procter & Gamble to develop a more applicable process for corporate innovation. Procter and Gamble became his own laboratory for creative research. While at Procter & Gamble, Min proved the absolute importance of accurate problem definition in the problem solving process and achieving breakthrough insights. Here, Min also became aware of the practicality of focusing on the phrase How Might We in real world corporate problem solving to positively define problems. Min found the phrase "How Might We?" was most accepted among team members in industry in the critical step of defining problems. "How Might We?" eventually became an integral component in Basadur's "Why? - What's Stopping?" analysis and Challenge Mapping processes.

He continued to research methods of stimulating and harnessing creativity at Frito-Lay, Ford and Pepsico During that time, he also earned his MBA from Xavier University and PhD from the University of Cincinnati. His doctoral dissertation received the S. Rains Wallace Award for best doctoral research in the area of industrial and organizational psychology by the American Psychological Association The significance of this research established a landmark understanding that innovative and creative thinking can be learned and improved.

By 1981 Basadur had developed a methodology which he called Simplexity (originally Simplex) and a set of related tools for creative problem solving that could be used to improve creative performance in organizations. His method was based on encouraging and facilitating unobstructed thinking and developing a sense of shared ownership and responsibility among participants for the solution they collectively identify. Basadur conducted extensive research to back up his claims that this collaborative process significantly improved the likelihood of successful solutions being identified and implemented. Basadur founded the Center for Research in Applied Creativity to provide training in Simplexity Thinking to corporations, public institutions and governments.

To help organizations identify and encourage creative individuals and teams among their staff, Basadur invented the Basadur Creative Problem Solving Profile (CPSP), an Inventory designed to determine an individual's style of creative problem solving by measuring his or her preferred problem solving activities. The four styles Basadur identified are generation, conceptualization, optimization and implementation.

In 1994 and 1995. Basadur published two books on the subject of developing creativity, Flight to Creativity: How to Dramatically Improve Your Creative Performance. (1994 ) and The Power of Innovation: How to Make Innovation a Way of Life and Put Creative Solutions to Work (1995.)

In 2022 Basadur published, Design-Centered Entrepreneurship with Michael Goldsby and Rob Mathews, Scatterbrains: Teams Find Innovation by Thinking Differently with Richard Perez, and Think Better Do Better with Larry Crase.

He also contributed chapters to a number of books, and published many articles on the subject. [11] He has also made presentations at various scientific meetings.

== Published works ==
=== Books ===
- 1994: Flight to Creativity: How to Dramatically Improve Your Creative Performance. Creative Education Foundation Press/Applied Creativity Press ISBN 0-930222-19-9
- 1995: The Power of Innovation: How to Make Innovation a Way of Life and Put Creative Solutions to Work. London, U.K: Pitman Professional Publishing / Applied Creativity Press ISBN 0-273-61362-6
- 2016: Design-Centered Entrepreneurship, with Michael Goldsby - 2016.

=== Book chapters ===
- Basadur M.S , Basadur T.M. and Calic C (2023) . “Organizational Development.” in The Handbook of Organizational Creativity, 2 nd edition.
- Basadur, M.S. (1987). "Needed research in creativity for business and industrial applications". in Frontiers of Creativity Research: Beyond the Basics. (Editor: Isaksen, S.G.) Chapter 13. Buffalo, N.Y.: Bearly.
- Basadur, M.S. (1993). "Impacts and outcomes of creativity in organizational settings". in The Emergence of a Discipline: Nurturing and Developing Creativity. Volume II. (Editors: Isaksen, S.G., Murdock, M.C., Firestein, R.L. and Treffinger, D.J.), Chapter 12. New York: Ablex.
- Basadur, M.S. (2001). "The economic, social and psychological outcomes of implementing a deliberate process of organizational creativity". Chapter in Decision Making: Social and Creative Dimensions. Dordrecht: Kluwer Press.5. Editors: Allwood, C.M. and Selart, M.
- Basadur, M.S., Basadur, T.M. and Licina, G. (2012). "Organizational creativity and organizational development". Chapter 26 in the Handbook of Organizational Creativity. Elsevier. Editor: Michael D. Mumford.
- Basadur, M.S., Basadur, T.M. and Licina, G. (2013). "Simplexity Thinking". Chapter in the Encyclopedia of Creativity, Invention, Innovation, and Entrepreneurship. Springer. Editor: Ruchika Bhatt.
- Basadur, M.S. (1994). "Managing the creative process in organizations". In Problem Finding, Problem Solving, and Creativity. (Editor: M.A. Runco). Chapter 12. New York: Ablex.

=== Selected articles ===
- Wu, A., Calic, G., &amp; Basadur, M. S. (2022,). “4 types of innovators every organization needs” Harvard Business Review. October 27
- Basadur, M.S., Graen, G.B. and Green, S.G. (1982). "Training in creative problem solving: Effects on ideation and problem finding in an applied research organization". Organizational Behavior and Human Performance, Vol. 30, 41-70.
- Basadur, M.S. (2004). "Leading others to think innovatively together: Creative leadership". Leadership Quarterly, 15, 103–121.
- Basadur, M.S., Runco, M.A. and Vega, L.A. (2000). "Understanding how creative thinking skills, attitudes and behaviors work together: A causal process model". Journal of Creative Behavior, Vol. 34, (2), 77-100.
- Basadur, M.S. and Hausdorf, P.A. (1996). "Measuring divergent thinking attitudes related to creative problem solving and innovation management". Creativity Research Journal, Volume 9 (1), 21–32.
- Basadur, M.S. and Gelade, G. (2006). "The role of knowledge management in the innovation process". Creativity and Innovation Management. Vol. 15 (1), 45–62. March 2006.
- Basadur, M.S. and Finkbeiner, C.T. (1985). "Measuring preference for ideation in creative problem solving training". Journal of Applied Behavioral Science, Vol. 21 (1), 37–49.
- Basadur, M.S., Graen, G.B. and Scandura, T.A. (1986). "Training effects on attitudes toward divergent thinking among manufacturing engineers". Journal of Applied Psychology, Vol. 71 (4), 612–617.
- Basadur, M.S., Graen, G.B. and Wakabayashi, M. (1990). "Identifying individual differences in creative problem solving style". Journal of Creative Behavior, Vol. 24 (2), 111–131.
- Basadur, M.S. (1997). "Organizational development interventions for enhancing creativity in the workplace". Journal of Creative Behavior, Volume 31 (1), 59–72.
- Basadur, M.S. & Thompson, R. (1986). "Usefulness of the ideation principle of extended effort in real world professional and managerial problem solving". Journal of Creative Behavior, Vol. 20 (1), 23–34.
- Basadur, M.S., Wakabayashi, M., and Takai, J. (1989). "Receptivity of Japanese managers to creative problem solving experiential training". (In Japanese.) Japanese Journal of Administrative Behavior, Vol. 4 (2), 75–82.
- Basadur, M.S., Graen, G.B., Takai, J. and Wakabayashi, M. (1989). "Comparing attitudes toward divergent thinking of managers and non-managers before and after training". (In Japanese.) Japanese Journal of Administrative Behavior, Vol. 4 (1), 19–27.
- Basadur, M.S., Wakabayashi, M. and Graen, G.B. (1990). "Individual problem solving styles and attitudes towards divergent thinking before and after training". Creativity Research Journal, Vol. 3 (1), 22–32.
- Basadur, M.S., Wakabayashi, M., and Takai, J. (1992). "Training effects on the divergent thinking attitudes of Japanese managers". International Journal of Intercultural Relations, Vol. 16, 329–345.
- Basadur, M.S. (1992). "Managing creativity: A Japanese model". Academy of Management Executive, Vol. 6 (2), 29–42.
- Basadur, M.S. and Paton, B.R. (1993). "Using creativity to boost profits in recessionary times - broadening the playing field". Industrial Management, Vol. 35 (1), 14–19.
- Runco, M.A. and Basadur, M.S. (1993). "Assessing ideational and evaluative skills and creative styles and attitudes". Creativity and Innovation Management, Vol. 2 (3), 166–173.
- Basadur, M.S. and Robinson, S.J. (1993). "The creative thinking skills needed for total quality management to become fact, not just philosophy". American Behavioral Scientist, 37 (1), 121–138.
- Basadur, M.S., Ellspermann, S.J., and Evans, G.W. (1994). "A new methodology for formulating ill-structured problems". OMEGA. The International Journal of Management Science, Vol. 22 ( 6), 627–645.
- Basadur, M.S. (1995). "Optimal ideation-evaluation ratios". Creativity Research Journal, Vol. 8 (1), 63–75.
- Basadur, M.S., Taggar, S. and Pringle, P.F. (1999). "Improving the measurement of divergent thinking attitudes in organizations". Journal of Creative Behavior, Volume 33 (2), 75-111.
- Basadur, M.S., Pringle, P.F., Speranzini, G. and Bacot, M. (2000) "Collaborative problem solving through creativity in problem definition: Expanding the pie". Creativity and Innovation Management, Vol. 9 (1), 54–76.
- Basadur, M.S., Potworowski, J.A., Pollice, N. and Fedorowicz, J. (2001). "Increasing understanding of technology management through challenge mapping". Creativity and Innovation Management, Vol. 9 (4), 245–258.
- Basadur, M.S. and Head, M. (2001). "Team performance and satisfaction: A link to cognitive style within a process framework". Journal of Creative Behavior, Volume 35 (4), 227–248.
- Basadur, M.S., Pringle, P.F. and Kirkland, D. (2002). "Crossing Cultures: Training effects on the divergent thinking attitudes of Spanish-speaking South American managers". Creativity Research Journal, Vol. 14 (3 & 4), 395–408.
- Basadur, M.S. and Gelade, G. (2003). "Using the creative problem solving profile (CPSP) for diagnosing and solving real-world problems". Emergence: Journal of Complexity Issues in Organizations and Management. Vol. 5 (3), 22–47.
- Basadur, M.S. (2003). "Reducing complexity in conceptual thinking using challenge mapping". The International Journal of Thinking and Problem Solving. Vol. 13 (2), 5–7.
- Basadur, M.S. (2005). "Management: Synchronizing different kinds of creativity." In "Creativity across domains: Faces of the Muse". Lawrence Erlbaum. Ch. 15, pp. 261–279. Editors; Kaufman, J.C. and Baer, J.
- Basadur, M.S. and Gelade, G. (2005). "Modeling applied creativity as a cognitive process: Theoretical foundations". The International Journal of Thinking & Problem Solving. Vol. 15 (2), 13–41.
- Ellspermann, S.J., Evans, G.W. and Basadur, M.S. (2007). "The impact of training on the formulation of ill-structured problems". Omega, International Journal of Management Science. Vol. 35:2, pp 221–236.
- Basadur, T.M., Basadur, M.S. and Gelade, G. (2008). "Cognitive problem solving style as related to person-vocation fit and person-organizational hierarchy level of fit". Presented at the Southwest Academy of Management Conference, February 24–28, Houston, TX.
- Basadur, M.S., Gelade, G. and Basadur, T.M. (2008). "Improved reliability and research applications of the Creative Problem Solving Profile (CPSP)". Published in the proceedings of the Southern Management Association Conference, St. Petersburg, FL, October 30.
- Basadur, M.S. and Gelade, G. (2009). "Creative problem solving style and cognitive work demands". Presented at the Annual Conference of the Society of Industrial and Organizational Psychology, New Orleans. April 2–4.
- Basadur, M.S., Gelade, G., Basadur, T.M. and Skorokhod, T. (2009). "Testing the predictive validity of the Basadur creative problem solving profile (CPSP)". Published in the Proceedings of the Southwest Academy of Management Annual Meeting, February 25–28, 2009, Oklahoma City.
- Basadur, M.S. and Basadur, T.M. (2010). "How creativity relevant attitudes trigger behaviors, skills and performance". Presented at Society for Industrial and Organizational Psychology (SIOP) 2010 Annual Conference, April 8–10, Atlanta.
- Basadur, T.M., Beuk, F. and Monllor, J. (2010). "Regulatory fit: How individuals progress through the stages of the creative process". Published in the proceedings of the Academy of Management (AOM) annual conference, August 11, 2010, Montreal.
- Basadur, T.M. and Basadur, M.S. (2010). "The role of creative problem solving style in advice network formation and subsequent creative performance". Presented at the Southern Management Association (SMA) annual meeting, October 28, 2010, St. Petersburg, Florida.
- Basadur, M.S. and Basadur, T.M. (2011). "Attitudes and creativity". Encyclopedia of Creativity, 2nd Edition, vol. 1, 85–95. San Diego: Academic Press. Editors: Runco, M.A., and Pritzker, S.R.
- Basadur, M.S. and Basadur, T.M. (2011). "Where are the generators? Psychology of Aesthetics", Creativity and the Arts, Vol 5 (1), 29–42.
- Basadur, M.S., Basadur, M.S., Gelade, G., Basadur, T.M. (in press, 2013). "Creative Problem Solving Process Styles", Cognitive Work Demands and Organizational Adaptability. Journal of Applied Behavioral Science.
- Basadur, M.S., Gelade, G.A, Basadur, T.M and Perez, R. (2016). "Improved reliability and research applications of the Basadur Creative Problem Solving Profile (CPSP)". Kindai Management Review.
- Basadur, M.S., Basadur, T.M. and Beuk, F. (2014). "Facilitating high quality idea evaluation using telescoping". In: Wirtschaftspsychologie (Business Creativity) 16 (2), pp. 59–71
- Zhang, H., Basadur, T. M. and Schmidt, J. B. (2014). "Information Distribution, Utilization, and Decisions by New Product Development Teams". Journal of Product Innovation Management, 31: 189–204.
- Basadur, M.S. (2014). "Navigating the world of innovation". Chapter 5 in Vol. IX, LMX Leadership: The Series, Millennial Spring: Designing the Future of Organizations. Charlotte, NC: Information Age Publishing, Inc. Editors: Grace, M. & Graen G.
- Basadur, M.S., Gelade, G., and Basadur, T.M. (2013). "Creative problem solving process styles, cognitive work demands and organizational adaptability". Journal of Applied Behavioral Science, Vol. 50 (1), 78-113.
- Basadur, M.S., Basadur, T.M. and Licina, G. (2013). "Simplexity Thinking". Encyclopedia of Creativity, Invention, Innovation, and Entrepreneurship. Springer. Editor: Bhatt, R.
- Basadur, M.S., Basadur, T.M. and Licina, G. (2012). "Organizational creativity and organizational development". Handbook of Organizational Creativity. Elsevier. Editor: Mumford, M.D.

=== Additional Papers Presented at Scientific Meetings ===
- Basadur, T.M. and Basadur, M.S. (2008). "Telescoping: Enabling groups to achieve creative decisions with high consensus and commitment". Presented at 2008 Academy of Management Meeting, Anaheim, CA, August 8–13.
- Basadur, M.S., Basadur S., Basadur, T.M. and Beuk, F. (2009). "Facilitating high quality idea evaluation using telescoping". Presented at Academy of Management Annual Conference, Chicago, August.
- Basadur, M.S. and Basadur, T.M. (2009). "Evidence-based management and expertise: Using group brainstorming research to highlight the dangers of recommending the "best available scientific evidence" to practicing managers". Presented at the Midwest Academy of Management Annual Conference, Chicago, October. Basadur, M.S. (2009). Creativity and problem solving in recessionary times. Europa: Novas Fronteiras. The European Information Centre Jacques Delors (CIEJD). No. 24/25, Lisbon. January/December.
- Basadur, M.S. and Basadur, T.M. (2010). "What organizations must do to build permanent creativity". Presented at the Japan Creativity Society annual meeting, Kinki University, Osaka. October 17, 2010.
