= Alex Faickney Osborn =

American advertising executive, creator of brainstorming

- Born: May 24, 1888; Bronx, New York, U.S.
- Died: May 5, 1966 (aged 77); Buffalo, New York, U.S.
- Occupation(s): Advertising executive, writer, creativity theorist
- Known for: Co-founder of BBDO, development of brainstorming
- Spouse: Helen Coatsworth
- Children: 5

Alex Faickney Osborn (May 24, 1888 – May 5, 1966) was an American advertising executive and the author of the creativity technique named brainstorming.

== Founding of BBDO ==
In 1919, Osborn joined with Bruce Fairchild Barton and Roy Sarles Durstine to form the BDO advertising agency. Osborn acted as manager of BDO's Buffalo branch. He was largely responsible for the 1928 merger of BDO (Barton, Durstine & Osborn) with the George Batten Company to create BBDO.

After years of success and having survived the Great Depression, BBDO underwent a crisis in 1938, losing many of its clients and key personnel. Osborn commuted to New York City and eventually saved the company by securing the Goodrich tire account. In 1939, he became BBDO's executive vice president after Durstine resigned. Osborn was crucial in recruiting many top employees, including Ben Duffy, who eventually became the president of BBDO.

== Creativity theorist ==
Osborn became increasingly active as an author, and published several books on creative thinking. In his 1942 book How To Think Up he presented the technique of brainstorming, which had been used at BBDO. Eventually, Osborn's writing career overtook his work in advertising, and in 1960, after more than forty years, he resigned from BBDO's board of directors.

In 1954, Osborn set up the Creative Education Foundation, sustained by the royalties earned from his books. Along with Sidney Parnes, Osborn developed the "Osborn-Parnes Creative Problem Solving Process" (commonly referred to as CPS). He co-founded the Creative Education Foundation's Creative Problem Solving Institute, the world's longest-running international creativity conference, and CPS has been taught for more than 50 years.

== Notable advertising work ==
- General Electric
- Armstrong Cork
- Chrysler
- General Baking
- Royal Crown Cola
- American Tobacco
- BF Goodrich
- Du Pont
- Wildroot Hair Tonic

== Books ==
- A Short Course in Advertising, London, New York: Sir I. Pitman & Son, 1921. OCLC 562025307
- How to "Think Up", New York, London: McGraw-Hill Book Co., 1942. OCLC 562025301
- Your Creative Power, Scribner, 1948. OCLC 607142384
- Wake Up Your Mind: 101 Ways to Develop Creativeness, New York, London: Charles Scribner's Sons, 1952. OCLC 562025321
  - Translated into Japanese by Kazuo Kuwana 想像の翼をのばせ : 創造力をきたえる101の方法 Tōkyō : Jitsumu Kyōiku Shuppan, 1968 OCLC 673718577
- Applied Imagination: Principles and Procedures of Creative Problem Solving New York: Charles Scribner's Sons, 1953. OCLC 641122686
  - Revised edition, New York, Scribner, 1957 OCLC 1381383
  - 3rd ed. New York C. Scribner 1963 OCLC 757425639
  - French translation by Georges Rona and Pierre Dupont, L'Imagination constructive. Principes et processus de la Pensée créative et du Brainstorming, Paris, Dunod, 1959.
  - Chinese translation by Ikkō Shō, 応用想像力 Taipei : Kyōshi Kōgyō Sōsho Shuppan Kofun Yūgen Kōshi, 1965 OCLC 673537763

Osborn also contributed frequently to trade publications such as Printers' Ink.

== Family life ==
On September 15, 1916, he married Helen Coatsworth, the daughter of a wealthy Buffalo lawyer. They had five children: Katharine, Joan, Marion, Russell, and Elinor. Osborn died of cancer May 5, 1966, in Roswell Park Memorial Institute, where he had been a patient since April 1, 1966. He was 77 years old. He was cremated and his ashes are in a niche at Forest Lawn Cemetery in Buffalo, New York.

== Sources ==
Bruce Fairchild Barton, Roy Sarles Durstine, and Alex Faickney Osborn, Joan Vidal, João Lins.
