= Bodystorming =

Design process involving physical movement

Bodystorming is a technique sometimes used in interaction design or as a creativity technique. It has also been cited as catalyzing scientific research when used as a modeling tool.

The idea is to imagine what it would be like if the product existed, and act as though it exists, ideally in the place it would be used. It is going through an idea with improvised artifacts and physical activities to envision a solution. This user experience design (UXD) technique is ideal to design physical spaces (e.g. the interior design of a shop) but can also be used to design physical products or software.

== Use in Scientific Research ==
American dance company Black Label Movement's artistic director Carl Flink created a bodystorming system with University of Minnesota biomedical engineer David Odde in 2009 as a part of their Moving Cell Project. funded by the university's Institute for Advanced Study. The system initially brought dance artists and scientists together, including Dance Your PhD founder John Bohannon who first applied the term "bodystorming" to this method, in order to rapid prototype research hypotheses in biomedical engineering using choreographic rules for participants to follow. As a technique for scientists and dancers to model scientific theories, it has been credited with catalyzing scientific research and gives the participants the "psychological sense of what it would be like to be a molecule". Bodystorming sessions have been held at the 2018 Neuro-Oncology Symposium as well as the PSON Annual Investigators Meeting (2019) allowing scientists to use the bodystorming system to model their current research. It also "offers new opportunities to learn, teach, and drive new discoveries across disciplinary boundaries." Subsequently, research scientists have found the method not only "builds awareness of science" but understands that the body is "not just a site of knowledge but also a medium of communication." A typical bodystorming session poses scientific questions then "provides visual information on why a model works or fails and streamlines the process of selecting a successful model."

== Opinions on this method ==
The proponents of this idea like to point out the fact that you get up and move, trying things out with your own body, rather than just sitting around a table and discussing it while having to imagine it in the abstract (as in the case of brainstorming). It is a proper user-centered design method, since it can be carried out by the designers as well as the users of the final product.
