= Applied Imagination =

1953 book by Alex Faickney Osborn

Applied Imagination is an influential 1953 book on creative ideation by Alex Faickney Osborn, in which he introduces the technique of brainstorming.

== Chapters ==
1. The all-importance of imagination
2. Indispensability of creativity in science
3. Careers depend largely on creativity
4. Creativity in leadership and professions
5. Imagination can improve personal relations
6. Universality of imaginative talent
7. Ways by which creativity can be developed
8. Our new environment - its effect on creativity
9. Other factors that tend to cramp creativity
10. Creative and non-creative forms of imagination
11. The process of ideation vary widely
12. Orientation calls for setting our sights
13. Preparation and analysis go hand in hand

== Editions ==
- Osborn, Alex F. (1953). Applied Imagination: Principles and Procedures of Creative Problem Solving. New York: Charles Scribner's Sons, 1953. OCLC 641122686
  - Revised edition, New York, Scribner, 1957 OCLC 1381383
  - 3rd ed. New York C. Scribner 1963 OCLC 757425639
  - French translation by Georges Rona and Pierre Dupont, L'Imagination constructive. Principes et processus de la Pensée créative et du Brainstorming, Paris, Dunod, 1959.
  - Chinese translation by Ikkō Shō, 応用想像力 Taipei : Kyōshi Kōgyō Sōsho Shuppan Kofun Yūgen Kōshi, 1965 OCLC 673537763
