= Creative Education Foundation =

American nonprofit organization

The Creative Education Foundation (CEF) is a non-profit U.S. membership organization dedicated to creativity and problem solving, founded in Buffalo, New York, in 1954.

== History ==
The organization was established in 1954 by advertising specialist Alex F. Osborn, the inventor of the concept of brainstorming. In 1955, the organization held the first annual Creative Problem Solving Institute (CPSI), an international creativity conference, at the University of Buffalo.

For several years, the organization was led by Osborn together with creativity theorist and education researcher Sid Parnes. When Osborn died in 1966, Parnes took over the chair. He established the "Lifetime creative achievement award", granted to individuals who had shown outstanding merit in the field of applied creativity, and also installed a media program of CEF publications.

In 1987, John Meyerhoff took over as CEO, and expanded CEF's educational offer to include business training. Subsequent CEOs added partnership programs and VIP days, and reinstalled CEF consulting and training programs.

== Operations ==
Initially, the activities of the foundation focused on organizing the annual conference, developing and applying creativity tools and techniques, conducting research in the field of applied creativity, problem solving and innovation, publishing books and teaching materials, and developing an educational program including creativity for scholars and young people.

In 1967, as part of its research, the organization launched the Journal of Creative Behavior (JCB), a peer-reviewed first research publication devoted to the science of creativity, now published by Wiley-Blackwell. This was followed in 1972 by a monthly newsletter, Creativity in Action.

Since 1979 the CPSI conference has featured four major program streams: "Springboard for novices", "Leadership Development Program", "CPSI YouthWise", and "Extending sessions for exploratory studies".

From 1989 the organization sponsored creativity conferences on other continents to promote creativity and creative education, starting in Australia, and later followed by the South African ACRE conference (from 1994) and the European CREA conference (from 2003). In 2003 the CEF YouthWise program was launched in South Africa, and in 2011 the CPSI program expanded to include the "Creativity in the 21st Century Classroom" course.

== Research ==
CEF publishes a quarterly academic journal on the topic of creative thinking, the Journal of Creative Behavior, edited by Ronald A. Beghetto from the University of Connecticut. The journal deals with methods to foster creative productivity, giftedness, management of creative personnel, testing, creativity in business and industry, development of creative curricula, creativity in the arts and sciences, and reviews of literature on creativity and problem solving. The content also focuses on the creative process. After self-publishing 45 volumes since 1967, the journal moved to Wiley-Blackwell, a commercial publisher of academic journals.
