= Seven management and planning tools =

The seven management and planning tools have their roots in operations research work done after World War II and the Japanese total quality control (TQC) research.

== The New seven tools ==
=== Affinity diagram [KJ method] ===
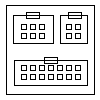
Affinity diagram

Affinity diagrams are a special kind of brainstorming tool that organize large amount of disorganized data and information into groupings based on natural relationships.

It was created in the 1960s by the Japanese anthropologist Jiro Kawakita. It is also known as KJ diagram, after Jiro Kawakita. An affinity diagram is used when:

1. You are confronted with many facts or ideas in apparent chaos.
2. Issues seem too large and complex to grasp.

=== Interrelationship diagram ===
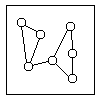
Interrelationship digraph

Interrelationship diagrams (IDs) displays all the interrelated cause-and-effect relationships and factors involved in a complex problem and describes desired outcomes. The process of creating an interrelationship diagram helps a group analyze the natural links between different aspects of a complex situation.

=== Tree diagram ===
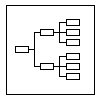
Tree diagram

This tool is used to break down broad categories into finer and finer levels of detail. It can map levels of details of tasks that are required to accomplish a goal or solution or task. Developing a tree diagram directs concentration from generalities to specifics.

=== Prioritization matrix ===
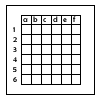
Matrix diagram

This tool is used to prioritize items and describe them in terms of weighted criteria. It uses a combination of tree and matrix diagramming techniques to do a pair-wise evaluation of items and to narrow down options to the most desired or most effective. Popular applications for the prioritization matrix include return on investment (ROI) or cost–benefit analysis (investment vs. return), time management matrix (urgency vs. importance), etc.

=== Matrix diagram or quality table ===
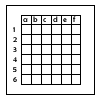
Matrix diagram

This tool shows the relationship between two or more sets of elements. At each intersection, a relationship is either absent or present. It then gives information about the relationship, such as its strength, the roles played by various individuals or measurements. The matrix diagram enables you to analyze relatively complex situations by exposing interactions and dependencies between things. Six differently shaped matrices are possible: L, T, Y, X, C, R and roof-shaped, depending on how many groups must be compared.

=== Process decision program chart ===
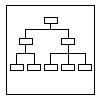
Process decision program chart

A useful way of planning is to break down tasks into a hierarchy, using a tree diagram. The process decision program chart (PDPC) extends the tree diagram a couple of levels to identify risks and countermeasures for the bottom level tasks. Different shaped boxes are used to highlight risks and identify possible countermeasures (often shown as "clouds" to indicate their uncertain nature). The PDPC is similar to the failure modes and effects analysis (FMEA) in that both identify risks, consequences of failure, and contingency actions; the FMEA also rates relative risk levels for each potential failure point.

=== Activity network diagram ===
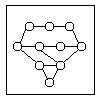
Arrow diagram

This tool is used to plan the appropriate sequence or schedule for a set of tasks and related subtasks. It is used when subtasks must occur in parallel. The diagram helps in determining the critical path (longest sequence of tasks). The purpose is to help people sequentially define, organize, and manage a complex set of activities.

== See also ==
- Seven basic tools of quality
