= Journal of Creative Behavior =

- Discipline: Psychology
- Language: English
- Edited by: Ronald A. Beghetto

Publication details
- History: 1967-present
- Publisher: Wiley-Blackwell on behalf of the Creative Education Foundation
- Frequency: Quarterly
- Impact factor: 3.9 (2022)

Standard abbreviations
- ISO 4: J. Creat. Behav.

Indexing
- ISSN: 0022-0175 (print); 2162-6057 (web)

Links
- Journal homepage; Online access; Online archive

The Journal of Creative Behavior is a quarterly peer-reviewed academic journal published by Wiley-Blackwell on behalf of the Creative Education Foundation. The journal was established in 1967. Its current editors are Ronald A. Beghetto (Arizona State University) and Maciej Karwowski (University of Wroclaw). The journal focuses on creativity and problem solving, including ways to foster creative productivity, creative learning, management of creative personnel, testing, creativity in business and industry, development of creative curricula, and creativity in the arts and the sciences.

According to the Journal Citation Reports, the journal has a 2022 impact factor of 3.9.
