= Jiro Kawakita =

- Born: May 11, 1920
- Died: July 8, 2009 (aged 89)
- Occupations: Geographer; Cultural anthropologist
- Known for: KJ Method, 1985 Ramon Magsaysay Award recipient

Jiro Kawakita (川喜田 二郎, Kawakita Jirō) was an ethnographer, a pioneer in participation of remote Nepalese villagers in researching their problems, resulting in practical benefits of potable water supplies and rapid rope-way transport across mountain gorges. He was awarded the Ramon Magsaysay Award in 1984.

He is reported as the author of KJ method for organizing notes, also termed affinity walls in UX Research. He viewed the method as an alternative to Western quantitative methods in ethnography.

Kawakita established the non-profit organisation Institute for Himalayan Conservation Japan.

== Bibliography ==
- Kawakita, J. (1957). Ethno-geographical observations on the Nepal-Himalaya. Peoples of Nepal Himalaya: scientific results of the Japanese expeditions to Nepal Himalayas 1952-1953, 3, 1-362.
- Kawakita, J. (1960). Last Rites and Lamas. Japan Quarterly, 7(4), 428.
- Kawakita, J. (1961). Some Ecological Observations in Nepal Himalaya: Torbo Ethnography, No. 3. The Japanese Journal of Ethnology, 25(4), 197-238.
- Kawakita, J. (1974). The hill Magars and their Neighbours (Vol. 3). Tokai University Press.
- Kawakita, J. (1984). Cultural ecology of Nepal Himalaya. Association for technical cooperation to the Himalayan areas.
- Kawakita, J. (1985). Synergic approach to mountain development: Case study of Sikha Valley in Nepal. Integrated Mountain Development, 402-424.
