= Chief innovation officer =

Executive-level position

A chief innovation officer (CINO) is a person in an organization, such as a company or government, who is responsible for managing the organization's process of innovation and change management. Companies started establishing this role in the early 2000s, and early people in the role had backgrounds in marketing, research and development, and corporate strategy. Organizations that choose to have a CINO tend to have a large technology component in their work and want to better manage technological change.

== Overview ==
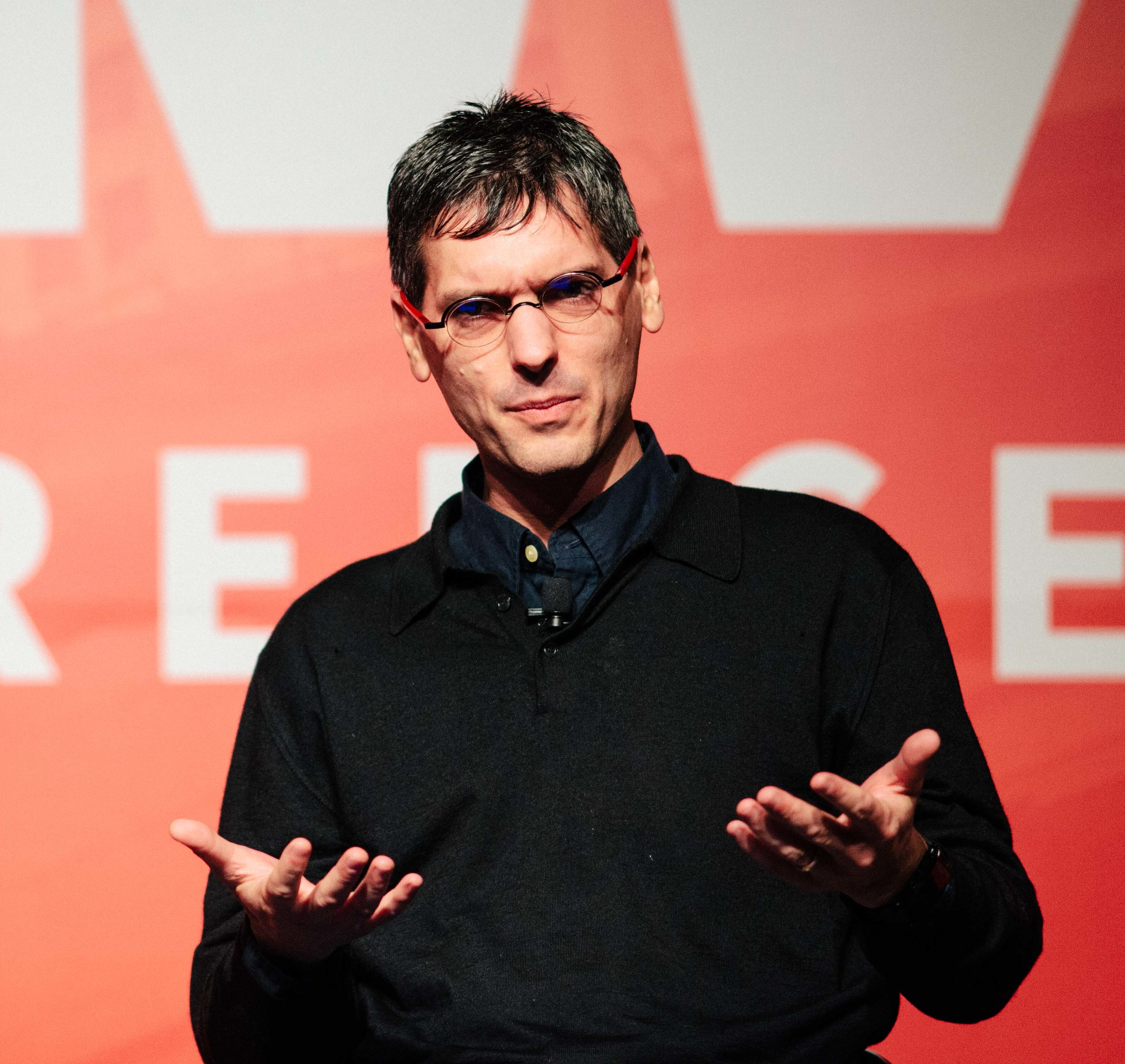
Tristan Louis was Global Chief Innovation Officer for HSBC in the 2000s

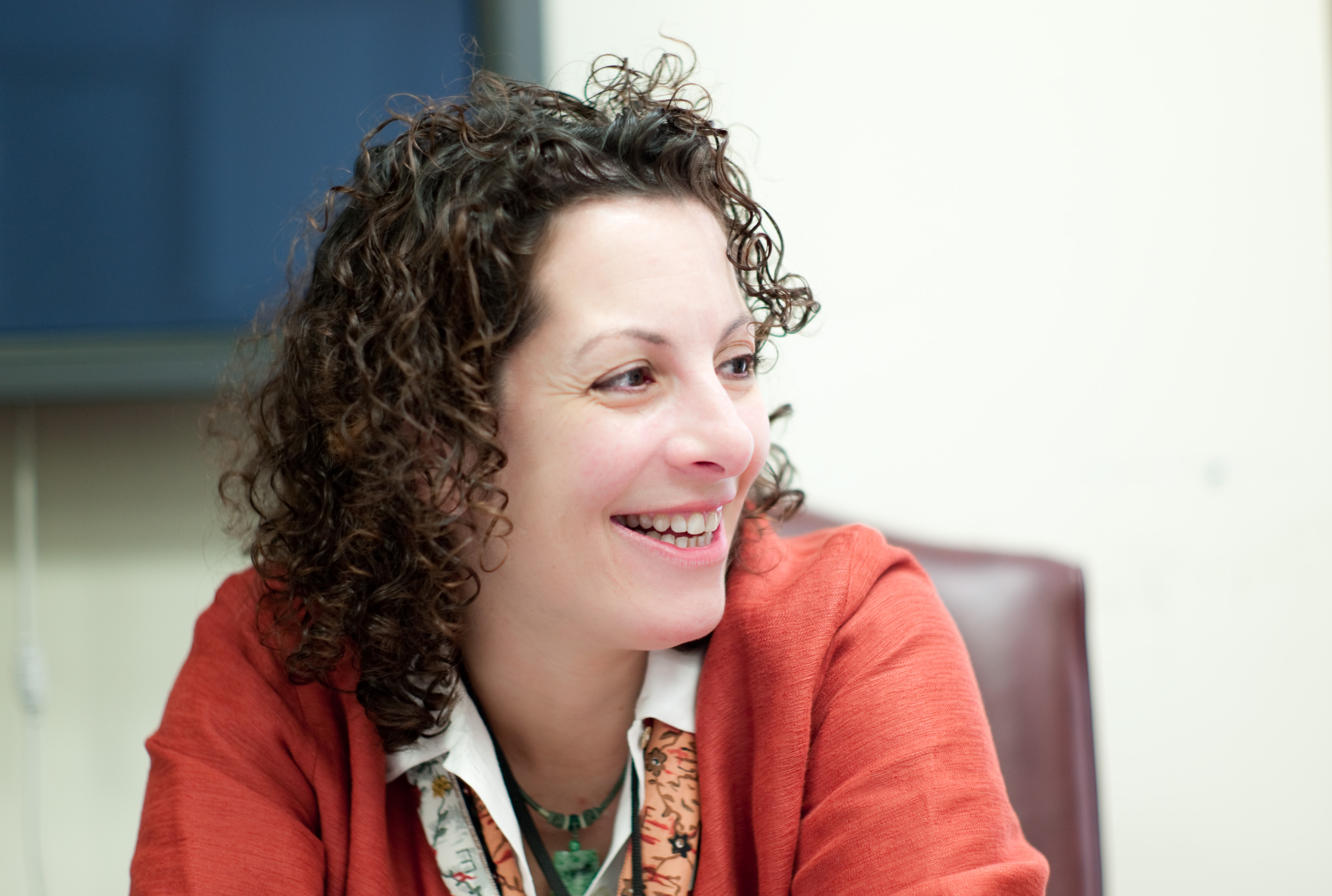
Beth Simone Noveck became Chief Innovation Officer for the state of New Jersey in 2018

The term "chief innovation officer" was first coined and described in the 1998 book Fourth Generation R&D. Organizations with a CINO are practicing part of the fourth generation of innovation theory and practice to emerge since 1900. Chief innovation officers focus on delivering on key principles behind innovation: leadership, creating networks, incorporating the voice of the customer in idea development, using the right incentives, and building and running an effective, transparent, and efficient innovation process.

The CINO is responsible for managing the innovation process inside the organization that identifies strategies, business opportunities and new technologies, and then develops new capabilities and architectures with partners, new business models and new industry structures to serve those opportunities. A related role is that of the chief idea officer. Some organizations, such as the California Department of Technology and the City of Cleveland, have a "chief technology innovation officer" role that specializes in initiatives related to emerging technologies.

A CINO does not have to report to the CEO or another C-level executive. However, for such a role to succeed it requires organisational support from the highest level possible and reporting to the CEO or one of their direct reports is a common practice. CINO is a functional title, similar to the chief information security officer. The words "chief" and "officer" are used to communicate that a person in this position is responsible for driving innovation throughout the entire organization. Using a functional "chief ... officer" title helps to communicate that this is a cross-organizational position and enables this person to work across organizational silos.

The coined term CINO is used to differentiate the position from the chief information officer, who is responsible for the information technology and computer systems that support enterprise goals.

== See also ==
- Chief creative officer
- Innovation management
