= International Futures Forum =

Scotland-based educational charity

- Formation: 2001
- Headquarters: Aberdour, Fife
- Director: Graham Leicester
- Staff: 3
- Website: www.internationalfuturesforum.com

The International Futures Forum (IFF) is an educational charity registered in Scotland that address complex, messy issues to enable people to thrive in the 21st century. It is funded through philanthropic grants, donations, the sale of its books, products, training and learning programmes.

== History ==
The IFF was established in 2001, with BP providing some significant financial backing. Early work by its founding members centred around the themes of economics, sustainability, governance and consciousness. Outputs included the book, Ten Things to do in a Conceptual Emergency and a pack of IFF Prompt Cards. After the initial two years IFF continued developing through its members voluntary work and occasional assignments.

The IFF has been registered as a charity in Scotland since September 2007. It is incorporated as a private limited company and registered with Companies House. IFF has a board of trustees which oversees its activities.

== Collaborations and output ==
The IFF has worked with a variety of organisations. Much of the material that is produced by the IFF is made available under a creative commons licence. The work has included areas such as health, learning, enterprise and governance. It has published a body of literature on futures thinking (particularly Three Horizons) and transformative innovation. It provides resources for download at the IFF Practice Centre and has a range of kits (including Kitbag) for practical engagement with its theory.

=== Kitbag ===
In 2004, The IFF Psychological Capacity project began, intending to look at cost-effective strategies and tools that could enlarge psychological capacity outside of care and welfare systems. In 2007 IFF received a grant from the National Endowment for Science, Technology and the Arts (NESTA) to further develop.

=== Community health ===
In 2005, the IFF were engaged by the Royal College of General Practitioners in Scotland (RCGP) on a project intended to distil the "essence" of general practice. In 2014, the IFF were commissioned by the RCGP to help with work on community engagement.

=== Glasgow life and health ===
The Glasgow Centre for Population Health (GCPH) formed in 2004 and the IFF have been involved in several of their projects. The IFF were one of several organisations to provide support for the "Glasgow Indicators" project. The GCPH also developed the "Glasgow Game" which was based upon the IFF's "World Game" that had been created by Tony Hodgson. "Miniature Glasgow" is a short film that GCPH made in collaboration with IFF to discuss life and health in Glasgow.

=== Curriculum for Excellence ===
The IFF did some work with Education Scotland (and previously with HM Inspectorate of Schools) to help schools reflect and consider what is possible under the permissive framework of Curriculum for Excellence. The IFF had first published a workbook in the Spring of 2009. Education Scotland later produced a kit for transformational change that was influenced by the IFF material.

=== Healthcare education ===
In 2011, the IFF facilitated a workshop for NHS Education for Scotland in Edinburgh attended by a mixture of participants responsible for service and education aspects of the health service.

=== Prison policy ===
In June 2014, Colin McConnell, chief executive of the Scottish Prison Service (SPS), delivered a speech at an event organised by the IFF. McConnell laid out a compelling case "for the public acceptance of the need for forgiveness and redemption as the future cornerstone for reducing reoffending".

== Funding ==
According to the IFF it enjoys "a variety of productive and mutually beneficial relationships with sponsors, clients, subscribers, like-minded groups, research funders and others". What they label "core support" comes from BP and BT. Other organisations the IFF has worked with include

- Diageo
- Foreign and Commonwealth Office
- Scottish Parliament
- Scottish Executive
- UK Nirex Ltd
- Scottish Enterprise
- World Economic Forum
- Tayside Health Board
- Glasgow Centre for Population Health

The IFF has a number of subscribers to their research output, among which are

- World Economic Forum
- Henley Centre
- Diageo
- Falkirk Council
- Audit Scotland
- AOL (Europe) Ltd
- Cultureshift Co-operative, Australia

Research funding has come from

- Scottish Enterprise Glasgow
- Society for Organizational Learning (Scotland)'

== Associated people ==
As of 2015, there are 5 staff employed by IFF, including the Director, Graham Leicester and Andrew Lyon, in a role described as "Converger".

The following people have also had some involvement:

- Martin Albrow − Formerly Professor of Sociology, State University of New York, Stony Brook, author
- Ruth Anderson − Chief Executive, Barataria Foundation, Scotland
- Tony Beesley − Conceptual artist and cartoonist
- Max Boisot − Adjunct professor of Asian Business and Comparative Management at INSEAD, Fontainebleau, France, author
- Roberto Carneiro − Former Education Minister, President of Grupo Forum, Portugal, UNESCO International Commission on Education for the Twenty-first Century
- Napier Collyns − Co-founder, Global Business Network (GBN), Emeryville, California
- Brian Goodwin − Schumacher College, Devon and Santa Fe Institute, author
- Mike Hambly − Business consultant, formerly Chief Executive, Digital Animations Group, Glasgow
- Margaret Hannah − Consultant in Public Health Medicine, deputy director of Public Health in NHS Fife (and married to Graham Leicester).
- Pat Heneghan − Director, ForthRoad Limited, Scotland
- Rebecca Hodgson − Researcher, International Futures Forum
- Tony Hodgson − Director, Decision Integrity Limited, founder Metabridge AB, collaborator with the Schumacher Institute for Sustainable Systems, Senior adviser to Global Leaders Group
- Robert E. Horn − Visiting Scholar, Stanford University, author
- Kees van der Heijden − Professor at Templeton College, Oxford, author
- Pat Kane − Writer, theorist and musician, Glasgow, author
- Eamonn Kelly −President, Global Business Network, Emeryville, California, author
- David Lorimer − Scientific and Medical Network, Scotland, editor
- Charles Lowe −Consultant, Former head of e-government BT
- Wendy Luhabe − Bridging the Gap, South Africa, author
- Arun Maira − Boston Consulting Group, Delhi, India, author
- Wolfgang Michalski − WM International, formerly Director, OECD International Futures Programme
- Maureen O'Hara − President Emerita, Saybrook Graduate School, San Francisco and IFF
- Ian Page − Former Research Manager / Futurist, HP Research Labs.
- Nick Rengger − Professor of Political Theory and International Relations, University of St Andrews, author
- Jennifer Williams − Director, Centre for Creative Communities, UK
- Mark Woodhouse − Professor of Philosophy Emeritus at Georgia State University, USA, author

== See also ==
- Futures studies
- Computer supported brainstorming
