= Creative problem-solving =

Mental process of problem solving

Creative problem-solving is the mental process of searching for an original and previously unknown solution to a problem. To qualify, the solution must be novel and reached independently. The creative problem-solving process was originally developed by Alex Osborn and Sid Parnes. Creative problem solving is a way of using creativity to develop new ideas and solutions to problems. The process is based on separating divergent and convergent thinking styles, in order to focus the mind on creating at the first stage, and then evaluating at the second stage.

Creative problem-solving can involve several processes beyond simply generating new ideas. The Creative problem-solving model includes understanding a challenge, generating ideas, preparing for action, and planning an approach. Research with primary school students found that these processes don't follow one specific order, suggesting that people may have their own way to work through a process when coming up with a solution.

== Creative solution types ==
The process of creative problem-solving usually begins with defining the problem. This may lead to finding a simple non-creative solution, a textbook solution, or discovering prior solutions developed by other individuals. If the discovered solution is sufficient, the process may then be abandoned.

Research on creative problem-solving has also examined the roles of fact finding, problem finding, and solution finding. Fact finding involes exploring information related to a problem, while problem finding involves identifying and defining the problem that needs to be solved. In a study of primary school students, fact finding and problem finding were positively related with the number and originality of ideas that the students produced.

A creative solution will often have distinct characteristics that include using only existing components, or the problematic factor, as the basis for the solution. However, a change of perspective may in many cases be helpful. A solution may also be considered creative if readily available components can be used to solve the problem within a short time limit.

If a creative solution has a broad application, such that the usage goes beyond the original intent, it may be referred to as an innovative solution, or an innovation (some innovations may also be considered an invention).

== Techniques and tools ==
A wide range of techniques and tools used to develop effective solutions is surveyed in the articles on creativity techniques and problem-solving.

=== Creative problem-solving technique categories ===
Mental state shift and cognitive re-framing: changing one's focus away from active problem-solving and towards a creative solution set.

Multiple idea facilitation: increasing the quantity of fresh ideas based on the belief that a greater number of ideas will raise the chances that one of these is valuable. This may include randomly selecting an idea (such as choosing a word from a list) and thinking about its similarities to the situation. In turn, this random act may inspire a related idea that would lead to a solution.

Inducing a change of perspective: efficiently entering a fresh perspective may result in a solution that thereby becomes obvious. This is especially useful for solving particularly challenging problems. Many techniques to this end involve identifying independent dimensions that differentiate closely associated concepts. Differentiating concepts help overcome a tendency to use oversimplified associative thinking, in which two related concepts are so closely associated that their differences are overlooked.

== Idea generation techniques ==
Brainstorming: an idea generation method invented by Alex Osborn and further developed by Charles Hutchison Clark. Brainstorming aims to encourage the generation of new and unusual ideas in a group of people. Alex Osborn based his development of brainstorming on the Indian technique Prai-Barshana, which has been around for about 400 years. He named brainstorming after the idea of this method, namely "using the brain to storm a problem."

Creative thinking: coming up with ideas, especially innovative ideas, needs creativity and can be supported by certain creativity techniques. The creativity process is usually applied through a person, product, process, and place. Thus, creativity means that a creative person develops great ideas and novel products through a creative process in a creative environment. Creativity processes use these influencing factors as they support the search for ideas, problem solving and evaluation, and selection of ideas via rules, a group of people, and a creative process.

Design thinking: an approach to problem-solving and ideation process that works through four key elements.

The user as the starting point Interdisciplinary team Iterative process Creative environment. In the design thinking process, the customer's needs are first determined through an iterative process and a question is defined, then creative solutions and ideas are generated through brainstorming and visualized via prototypes for user feedback.

Complex opportunity recognition techniques: Opportunity recognition describes the identification of opportunities to generate growth for companies. The different idea generation techniques of opportunity recognition are based either on the market, the company, or the company's environment. In order for this approach to be suitable for young companies, it must fulfill the following attributes:

Not too resource-intensive Suitable for workshops High growth potential Don't require existing structures or certain age of the company

== See also ==
=== Related articles ===
Creativity

Chief idea officer

Chief creative officer

Collective problem solving

Frugal innovation

Invention

Lateral thinking

Problem structuring methods

Systems thinking

TRIZ

Saturnino de la Torre

=== Related lists ===
List of thought processes

List of cognitive biases

List of creative thought processes

List of decision-making processes

List of emotional intelligence topics

List of emerging technologies

List of counseling topics
