= Nina Winthrop =

American choreographer

Nina Winthrop (born July 5, 1956; New York, New York) is an American choreographer. She formed her company Nina Winthrop and Dancers in 1991 and her work has been presented at numerous venues including Brooklyn Academy of Music, Danspace Project, Joyce SoHo, The Flea Theater, Mabou Mines' Toronada Theater at PS 122 and Movement Research at The Judson Church.

Winthrop was a graduate of Bennington College. She was married to composer Jon Gibson, with whom she frequently collaborated, from 2008 until his death in October 2020.
