= Disney method =

Creative thinking technique

The Disney Method, referring to the Walt Disney Creative Strategy, was further developed by Robert Dilts in 1994, in which four different thinking styles are used in turn, and repeated in a cycle until the necessary goals have been adequately fulfilled.

== Method ==
It involves sequential thinking to analyse a problem, generate ideas, evaluate ideas, construct and critique a plan of action. The four thinking styles are – outsiders, dreamers, realisers, and critics:

1. In the first thinking style the group thinks as "outsiders" to gain an analytical, external view of the challenge.
2. They then act as "dreamers" to brainstorm ideal solutions. They use divergent thinking to conceive creative and radical ideas.
3. In the next mode the group adopts a "realiser" viewpoint. They act as pragmatic realists and use convergent thinking to review the ideas left by the dreamers. They select the best idea and construct a plan for it.
4. The fourth viewpoint is that of "critics". They review the plan made by the realists in order to identify weaknesses, obstacles or risks. They seek to improve the plan.

IGD Learning in "Working collaboratively: The Disney Method Strategy" breaks down these parts and how they can be implemented in the workforce:

- When you are a "Dreamer" you are creative, passionate, think of the big picture, letting your imagination run, lay it all out and allow yourself to think big.
- When you are a "Realist" you are thinking more logically, narrow ideas to a short list, take the best idea, create an action plan to apply idea into reality.
- When you are a "Critic" you are thinking more critically, what obstacles will you face, what things could go wrong having heard the action plan and what the dreamer wants, break it down.

== Similar methods ==
The method is comparable to and an alternative to de Bono's method of the Six Thinking Hats. The difference is, that in the Disney method the sequence is constant, whereas the Six Thinking Hats can be used in any appropriate order.
