= Sid Parnes =

American academic (1922–2013)

Dr. Sidney J. Parnes
- Born: January 5, 1922
- Died: August 19, 2013 (aged 91)
- Known for: Creative problem solving techniques

Sidney J. Parnes (January 5, 1922 – August 19, 2013) was an American academic who was professor at Buffalo State University (located in Buffalo, New York) and the co-founder of the International Center for Studies in Creativity. The center is housed within Buffalo State University, one of the few places in the world that offers a Master's of Science degree in creativity. The department also now offers a distance learning version of the degree to students around the world as well as an undergraduate minor in creative studies.

Parnes was a lifetime trustee of the Creative Education Foundation (CEF). He joined the CEF in 1955 to help develop a comprehensive educational program for the Creative Problem Solving Institute, which is the world's longest-running international creativity conference. In 1966, CEF's founder, Alex Osborn died, leaving Parnes to head the foundation.

Parnes and Alex Osborn developed the Creative Problem Solving Process (CPS), a structured method for generating solutions to problems. This method is taught annually at the International Center for Studies in Creativity, the Creative Problem Solving Institute and the CREA Conference in Europe.

== Selected works ==
- Parnes, Sidney J. (1960). Instructors manual for semester courses in creative problem solving. Creative Education Foundation.
- Parnes, Sidney J. (1961). Student workbook for creative problem-solving courses and institutes. University of Buffalo.
- Parnes, Sidney J., ed. (June 1962). A Source Book for Creative Thinking. Scribner. ISBN 978-0-684-10448-5.
- Parnes, Sidney J. (1966). Programming Creative Behavior. State University of New York.
- Parnes, Sidney J. (1967). Creative Behavior Guidebook. Charles Scribner's Sons.
- Parnes, Sidney J. (June 1972). Creativity: Unlocking Human Potential. Creative Education Foundation. ISBN 978-0-914634-05-8.
- Parnes, Sidney J. (1974). Toward Supersanity: Channeled Freedom. D.O.K. Publishers.
- Parnes, Sidney J. (1975). Aha! Insights Into Creative Behavior. D.O.K. Publishers.
- Parnes, Sidney J. (1976). Assessing Creative Growth: Measured Changes Book 2. Creative Education Foundation.
- Parnes, Sidney J.; Noller, Ruth B. (February 1, 1977). Guide to Creative Action. Charles Scribner's Sons. ISBN 978-0-684-14888-5.
- Parnes, Sidney J. (June 1981). Magic of Your Mind. Creative Education Foundation.
- Parnes, Sidney J. (June 1985). Facilitating Style of Leadership. Bearly Limited. ISBN 978-0-943456-08-9.
- Parnes, Sidney J. (1988). Visionizing: State-of-the-Art Processes for Encouraging Innovative Excellence. D.O.K. Publishers. ISBN 0-88047-156-5.
- Parnes, Sidney J. (1992). Visionizing : State-of-the-art processes for encouraging innovative excellence. Creative Education Foundation Press.
- Parnes, Sidney J. (December 1992). Visionizing. Creative Education Foundation. ISBN 978-0-930222-88-8.
- Parnes, Sidney J., ed. (December 1992). Source Book for Creative Problem Solving: A Fifty Year Digest of Proven Innovation Processes. Creative Education Foundation. ISBN 978-99945-974-9-9.
- Parnes, Sidney J. (September 1, 1997). OPTIMIZE the Magic of Your Mind. Bearly Limited. ISBN 978-0-943456-41-6.
