= 6-3-5 Brainwriting =

Group brainstorming technique

6-3-5 Brainwriting (or 635 Method, Method 635) is a group-structured brainstorming technique aimed at aiding innovation processes by stimulating creativity developed by Bernd Rohrbach who originally published it in a German sales magazine, the Absatzwirtschaft, in 1968.

In brief, it consists of 6 participants supervised by a moderator who are required to write down 3 ideas on a specific worksheet within 5 minutes; this is also the etymology of the methodology's name. The outcome after 6 rounds, during which participants swap their worksheets passing them on to the team member sitting at their right, is 108 ideas generated in 30 minutes. The technique is applied in various sectors but mainly in business, marketing, design, and writing, as well as everyday real life situations.

== Introduction ==
6-3-5 Brainwriting is a particular form of brainstorming through the medium of graphics; in particular, it is classified under the intuitive and progressive methodologies as it involves driving inspiration from other members in a cyclical way. The grounding of such technique is the belief that the success of an idea generation process is determined by the degree of contribution and integration to each other's suggestions, and specifically it is meant to overcome the possible creativity barriers brought up by issues such as interpersonal conflicts, different cultural backgrounds and reasons of intellectual properties.

== Procedure ==
- The optimum application of the technique would require 6 participants, as too many would make the session unmanageable; however, sessions may be carried out also in teams of 4, 5 or 7, and the number of ideas generated would respectively be 48, 75 and 147.
- It is fundamental to assure that all participants share a deep background knowledge on the topic of the brainwriting session, since even a single not-well-informed individual can significantly affect the quality of the output. In addition to this, it is recommended that through a preliminary discussion, the group focuses on identifying the problem to be solved or the aim to be pursued. This can either occur through independent initiative of the group or guided by the supervisor.
- Once the topic of the session is narrowed down to a problem statement, this is announced and written on top of the Idea Form. This is a worksheet that has to be handed out to each participant and consists of a grid where the heading of the columns are Idea 1, Idea 2 and Idea 3 and the rows identify the name of who has contributed to that particular suggestion.
- At this point, the session is ready to start and participants are given 5 minutes to complete the first row and write down the first ideas, working in silence. These may be expressed in any graphical form: written, drawn, through a symbol, or however the author prefers.
- The supervisor signals the end of time, and the sheet is passed on to the next participant on the right. Now the process is repeated and each participant is free to get inspired from the idea he reads on the sheet written by his neighbour and contribute to them by integrating or completing them, or decide to ignore them and start a new one from scratch.
- The process goes on until the worksheet is completely filled in, but if the supervisor deems it necessary, the time for each round may be extended to a maximum of 10 minutes.
- The conclusion of the brainstorming session is a preliminary screening of the ideas that have been gathered, where exact duplicates are deleted, and a team evaluation takes place, perhaps using the Nominal Group Technique or Prioritization matrix, to select 1 to 3 ideas the group can focus on.

== Pros ==
One of the main advantages of using 6-3-5 brainwriting is that it is a very straightforward method, and therefore is easy and quick to learn. In addition to this, no particular training for the supervisor is required.

Secondly, it valorises the possible different backgrounds of participants, since it encourages sharing and exchanging knowledge. In contrast to traditional brainstorming, it assures active participation from all members, and at the same time avoids issues of domination over introverts, who are also likely to feel more free about expressing their own ideas instead of potentially having their potential inhibited by those who shout louder.

All ideas are recorded on the worksheet; this means that nobody has to be in charge of taking notes throughout the session, and it adds a motivational factor, since it is possible to keep track of the author of a particular idea.

Overall, this leads to a gain of efficiency that might imply an economic benefit, since by hiring 6 members 108 possible content ideas are generated.

== Cons ==
Expressing ideas in a written form may lead to issues in clarity, due to participants having trouble summarising their ideas or reading their colleagues' handwriting or graphical representations.

The system's constraints might require additional time for some people to become familiar with the methodology.

There is a risk of clash of similar ideas, since there is no immediate group discussion, which constitutes a loss of possible innovation.

== See also ==
- Edward de Bono
- Heuristic
- Mind mapping
- Six thinking hats
- Synectics
- TRIZ
