= University of Minnesota College of Liberal Arts =

Coordinates: 44°58′33.1″N 93°14′11.0″W

College of Liberal Arts
- Type: Public university
- Established: 1868
- Dean: GerShun Avilez
- Students: 16,389
- Undergraduates: 13,617
- Postgraduates: 1,571
- Location: Minneapolis, U.S.
- Campus: Urban
- Website: cla.umn.edu

The University of Minnesota College of Liberal Arts (CLA) is the largest college within the University of Minnesota Twin Cities campus. Established in 1868, the college offers more than 60 undergraduate majors and 70 minors, alongside over 30 graduate and professional degree programs. It serves a total student body of more than 14,000. The college's academic departments and research centers are distributed across 31 buildings located on both the East Bank and West Bank areas of the university's Minneapolis campus.

== Academic majors and minors ==
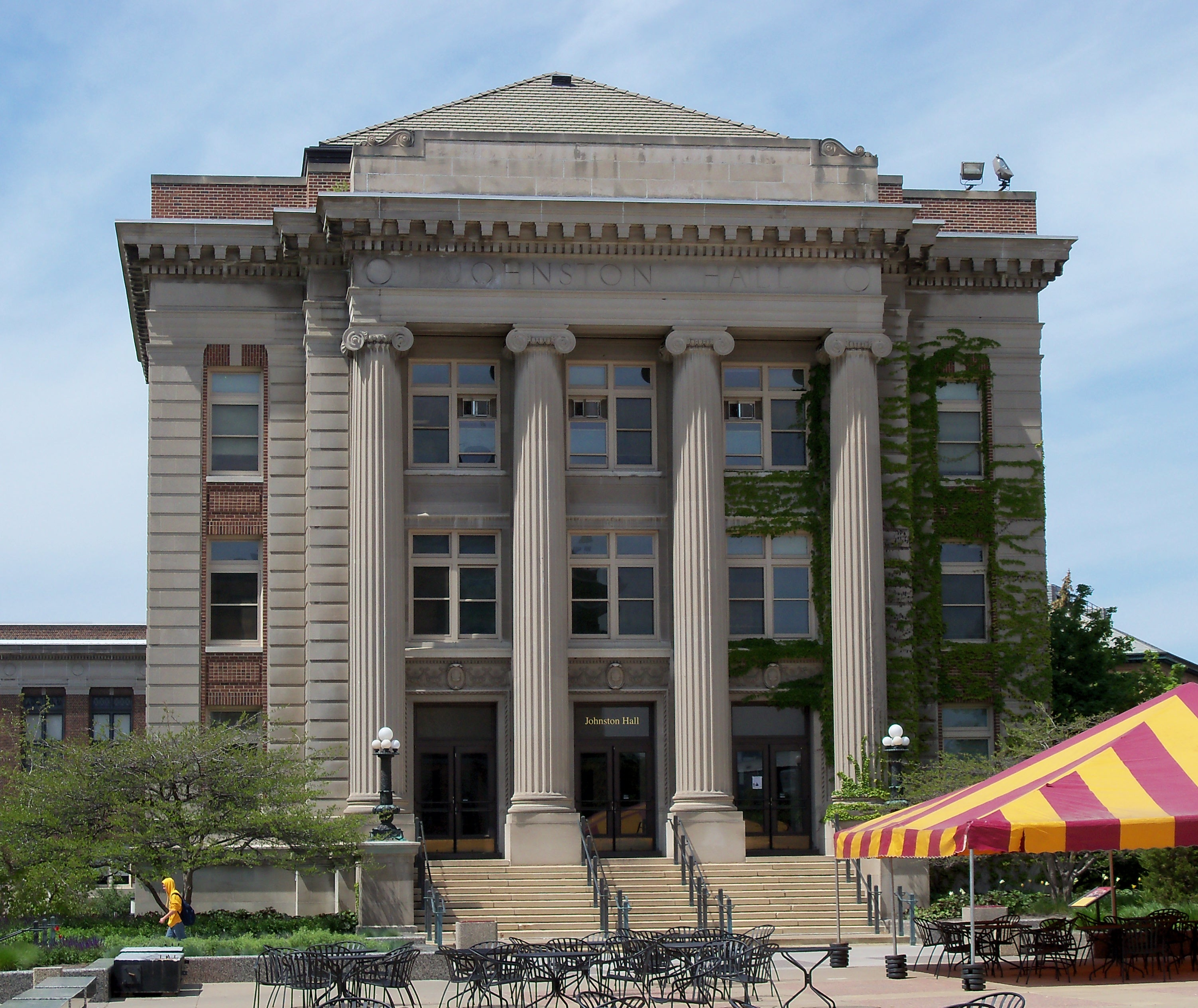
Johnston Hall, CLA Offices

The College of Liberal Arts offers numerous programs of study. A partial list includes:

- Acting
- African American and African Studies
- American Indian Studies
- American Studies
- Anthropology
- Art
- Art History
- Asian and Middle Eastern Studies
- Astrophysics
- Biblical Studies
- Biology, Society, & Environment
- Chemistry
- Chicano-Latino Studies
- Child Psychology
- Classics
- Communication Studies
- Computer Science
- Cultural Studies and Comparative Literature
- Dance
- Developmental Psychology
- Earth Sciences
- Economics
- Economics - Quantitative Emphasis
- English
- Environmental Geosciences
- French Studies
- French and Italian Studies
- Gender, Women, and Sexuality Studies
- Geography
- German, Scandinavian & Dutch Studies
- Global Studies
- History
- Human Physiology
- Individualized Studies
- Individually Designed Interdepartmental B.A.
- Italian Studies
- Jewish Studies
- Journalism
- Linguistics
- Mass Communication
- Mathematics
- Medieval Studies
- Music
- Music Education
- Music Therapy
- Ojibwe Language
- Philosophy
- Physics
- Physiology
- Political Science
- Psychology
- Religious Studies
- Russian
- Sociology
- Sociology of Law, Criminology, and Deviance
- Spanish Studies
- Spanish and Portuguese Studies
- Speech-Language-Hearing Sciences
- Statistics
- Strategic Communication: Advertising & Public Relations
- Studies in Cinema & Media Culture
- Technical Writing & Communication
- Theatre Arts
- Urban Studies
