= Nominal group technique =

Decision making method

The nominal group technique (NGT) is a group process involving problem identification, solution generation, and decision-making. It can be used in groups of many sizes, who want to make their decision quickly, as by a vote, but want everyone's opinions taken into account (as opposed to traditional voting, where only the largest group is considered). The method of tallying is difference. First, every member of the group gives their view of the solution, with a short explanation. Then, duplicate solutions are eliminated from the list of all solutions, and the members proceed to rank the solutions, 1st, 2nd, 3rd, 4th, and so on.

Some facilitators will encourage the sharing and discussion of reasons for the choices made by each group member, thereby identifying common ground and a plurality of ideas and approaches. This diversity often allows the creation of a hybrid idea (combining parts of two or more ideas), often found to be even better than those ideas being initially considered.

In the basic method, the numbers each solution receives are totaled, and the solution with the highest (i.e. most favored) total ranking is selected as the final decision. There are variations in how this technique is used. For example, it can identify strengths versus areas in need of development, rather than be used as a decision-making voting alternative. Also, options do not always have to be ranked but may be evaluated more subjectively.

This technique was originally developed by Andre Delbecq and Andrew H. Van de Ven, and has been applied to adult education program planning by Vedros, and has also been employed as a useful technique in curriculum design and evaluation in educational institutions.

Taking cue from the technique, Tunde Varga-Atkins, Jaye McIsaac and Ian Willis found that a two-stage combination of focus group and the nominal group technique, coined as nominal focus group, was particularly effective as an evaluation method.

== Effects ==
NGT has been shown to enhance one or more dimensions of effectiveness of decision-making groups. Requiring individuals to write down their ideas silently and independently prior to a group discussion increased the number of solutions generated by groups. Round-robin polling also resulted in a larger number of inputs and fostered more equal participation. The increased number of heterogeneous inputs led to high-quality decisions.

As compared to interacting groups the NGT groups provide more unique ideas, more balanced participation between group members, increased feelings of accomplishment, and greater satisfaction with idea quality and group efficiency.

These findings are consistent with a 1958 study which found that, in response to three different problems requiring creative thinking, the number of ideas produced by "nominal groups" (whose members were actually working alone) was greater than the number of ideas produced by real, face-to-face groups. The ideas generated by the nominal and real groups were rated qualitatively and for originality, and the nominal groups scored better on both of those measures.

== Usage ==
The nominal group technique is particularly useful:

- When some group members are much more vocal than others.
- When some group members think better in silence.
- When there is concern about some members not participating.
- When the group does not easily generate quantities of ideas.
- When all or some group members are new to the team.
- When the issue is controversial or there is heated conflict.
- When there is a power-imbalance between facilitator and participants or participants: the structure of the NGT session can balance these out.
- When stakeholders like a(/some) quantitative output of the process.

== Standard procedure ==
Routinely, the NGT involves five stages:

1. Introduction and explanation: The facilitator welcomes the participants and explains to them the purpose and procedure of the meeting.
2. Silent generation of ideas: The Facilitator provides each participant with a sheet of paper with the question to be addressed and ask them to write down all ideas that come to mind when considering the question. During this period, the facilitator asks participants not to consult or discuss their ideas with others. This stage lasts approximately 10 minutes.
3. Sharing ideas: The Facilitator invites participants to share the ideas they have generated. She records each idea on a flip chart using the words spoken by the participant. The round robin process continues until all ideas have been presented. There is no debate about items at this stage and participants are encouraged to write down any new ideas that may arise from what others share. This process ensures all participants get an opportunity to make an equal contribution and provides a written record of all ideas generated by the group. This stage may take 15–30 minutes.
4. Group discussion: Participants are invited to seek verbal explanation or further details about any of the ideas that colleagues have produced that may not be clear to them. The facilitator's task is to ensure that each person is allowed to contribute and that discussion of all ideas is thorough without spending too long on a single idea. It is important to ensure that the process is as neutral as possible, avoiding judgment and criticism. The group may suggest new items for discussion and combine items into categories, but no ideas should be eliminated. This stage lasts 30–45 minutes.
5. Voting and ranking: This involves prioritizing the recorded ideas in relation to the original question. Following the voting and ranking process, immediate results in response to the question is available to participants so the meeting concludes having reached a specific outcome.

The number of nominal group meetings to be held will depend on the nature of the question and accessibility to the key stakeholders best suited to help address the problem.

== Advantages and disadvantages ==
One major advantage of NGT is that it avoids two problems caused by group interaction. First, some members are reluctant to suggest ideas because they are concerned about being criticized, or are reticent and shy. Second, some members are reluctant to create conflict in groups. (Many people want to maintain a pleasant climate.) NGT overcomes these problems (e.g.). NGT has the clear advantage in ensuring relatively equal participation. It may also, in many cases be a time-saving technique. Other advantages include producing a large number of ideas and providing a sense of closure that is often not found in less-structured group methods.

A major disadvantage of NGT is that the method lacks flexibility by being able to deal with only one problem at a time. Also, there must be a certain amount of conformity on the part of the members involved in NGT. Everyone must feel comfortable with the amount of structure involved. Another disadvantage is the amount of time needed to prepare for the activity. There is no spontaneity involved with this method. Facilities must be arranged and carefully planned. Opinions may not converge in the voting process, cross-fertilization of ideas may be constrained, and the process may appear to be too mechanical.

One of the key issues about 'nominal' group technique is that it does not depend on normal group processes. It is a method to work with a collection of people and involve them in decision making but does not depend on existing group processes. This is according to the originators an advantage in decision making using this tool.

== Adaptation for ill-structured problems ==
Modification of NGT, undertaken by Bartunek and Murnighan, helps to deal with ill-structured problems. Normal ideas are generated and listed, followed by the facilitator questioning if the ideas are relevant to the same problem. If not, the problem is said to be ill-structured, and the ideas generated are clustered into coherent groups. These clusters of ill-structured ideas are then treated as problems in their own right, and the NGT procedure is applied to them. Regular breaks are taken by the participants to ensure that the group feels they are still working on the original problem.

== See also ==
- Brainstorming
- Creative problem solving
- Creativity techniques
- Delphi method
- Group decision making
- Social choice theory
- Voting paradox
- Voting system
