= Karen Holtzblatt =

American computer scientist

Karen Holtzblatt is an American computer scientist known for her contributions in human–computer interaction, and particularly in contextual design. She founded InContext Design in 1992 and is its CEO. Holtzblatt was elected to the CHI Academy in 2007 and won the inaugural ACM SIGCHI Lifetime Award for Practice in 2010. Holzblatt is also affiliated with the University of Maryland, as a research scientist in the Human-Computer Interaction Lab and iSchool.

== Books ==
Holtzblatt is the author or co-author of multiple books on user interface design, including:

- Contextual Design: Design for Life (with Hugh Beyer, Morgan Kaufmann, 2017)
- Contextual Design: Evolved (with Hugh Beyer, Morgan & Claypool, 2014)
- Rapid Contextual Design: A How-to Guide to Key Techniques for User-Centered (with Jessamyn Burns Wendell and Shelley Wood, Morgan Kaufmann, 2005)
- Contextual Design: Defining Customer-Centered Systems (with Hugh Beyer, Academic Press, 1998)
- Designing Composite Applications: Driving User Productivity and Business Information for Next Generation Business Applications (with Jörg Beringer, Galileo Press, 2006)
