= Front end innovation =

Front End Innovation is the starting point where opportunities are identified and concepts are developed prior to entering the formal product development process. Innovation on the Front End is where exciting breakthroughs are created through a process that allows for creativity and value creation in a systematic manner different from the formal development process.

In the Front End, idea genesis, opportunity validation, and concept development are dynamic and consists of adaptive interactions between involved participants with varied skills. They create, evaluate, analyze and iterate many alternatives and external technologies into potential breakthrough opportunities. The final result is a product concept including potential external technology partners, conceptual business model, preliminary product specifications, and the formation of a corporate sponsor team, a startup action plan, and Go/No Go milestones for insertion in to the formal development process.

Although less expensive than the later product development phases, Front End Innovation is vital; this is the point where decisions to invest resources are fundamentally made.

== Fuzzy Front End ==
The Front End of Innovation Stage is also sometimes described as the “Fuzzy Front End”, “Phase 0”, “Stage 0” or “Pre-Project Activities”. It is the starting point where opportunities are identified and concepts are developed prior to entering the formal product development process.

The Front End Innovation Process is really not “Fuzzy”, it's not a standard linear process as in formal development which is directed towards making a concept into reality. Front End Innovation has five specific categorically distinct efforts which are enacted in a non-Sequential iterative process allowing for discovery, creativity and concept validation. Non sequential due to the nature of discovery and inspiration that comes from new input being injected into the analysis process that triggers reevaluation of prior assumptions. The analysis must run its course as all assumptions are tested and modified until the participants are jointly satisfied that they have an optimum result that is ready to move forward conceptually or the concept is rejected and no further

== Five Generic Steps ==
There are five generic steps of Front End Innovation that describe the variety of tasks that encompass the process. In general, they are:

1. Preliminary analysis - includes high-level market, technology, and industry assessments. Preliminary analysis is not market research as the latter includes more focused investigation of market size and market segments.
2. Demand refinement - includes customer discovery, voice of the customer, and other related research.
3. Translational research - includes building prototypes and performing continued research in related domains, designed to demonstrate a key aspect of an otherwise early-stage technology.
4. Technology discovery and development - includes locating early-stage technologies, external or internal and testing potential minimum viable product concepts. This step can be achieved via early customer feedback, individually, or from focus groups. Early product trials as well as process concept testing can be completed through test runs on current equipment or equipment owned by others.
5. Portfolio analysis and triage - includes an examination of each potential innovation with criteria that differ substantially from the numerical analysis required by the Formal Process. The main goal of the portfolio analysis is to prioritize potential innovations and ask questions designed to increase understanding of the concept.

The steps are often not done in absolute order and often vary in sequence depending on iteration and discovery in other steps that drive a re-evaluation check along the way.

== Front End versus Back End ==
Front end innovation has been defined into two broad main efforts, the “idea generation effort” which starts the process and “since ideas must be executed in order to generate value, a “back-end” of innovation or “BEI” is required to test and refine the ideas and make them a reality” validation stage. This critical technology discovery and development stage includes locating early-stage technologies, external or internal and testing potential minimum viable product concepts. This step can be achieved via early customer feedback, individually, or from focus groups. Early product trials as well as process concept testing can be completed through test runs on current equipment or equipment owned by others. Based on feedback the effort may be terminated, cleared for insertion into the formal development process, or run through another non sequential innovation cycle.

A minimum viable product has just those features that allow the product to be deployed, and no more. The product is typically deployed to a subset of possible customers, such as early adopters that are thought to be more forgiving, more likely to give feedback, and able to grasp a product vision from an early prototype or marketing information. It is a strategy targeted at avoiding building products that customers do not want, that seeks to maximize the information learned about the customer per dollar spent.

== See also ==
- Front end
