= Brainstorming =

Group creativity technique

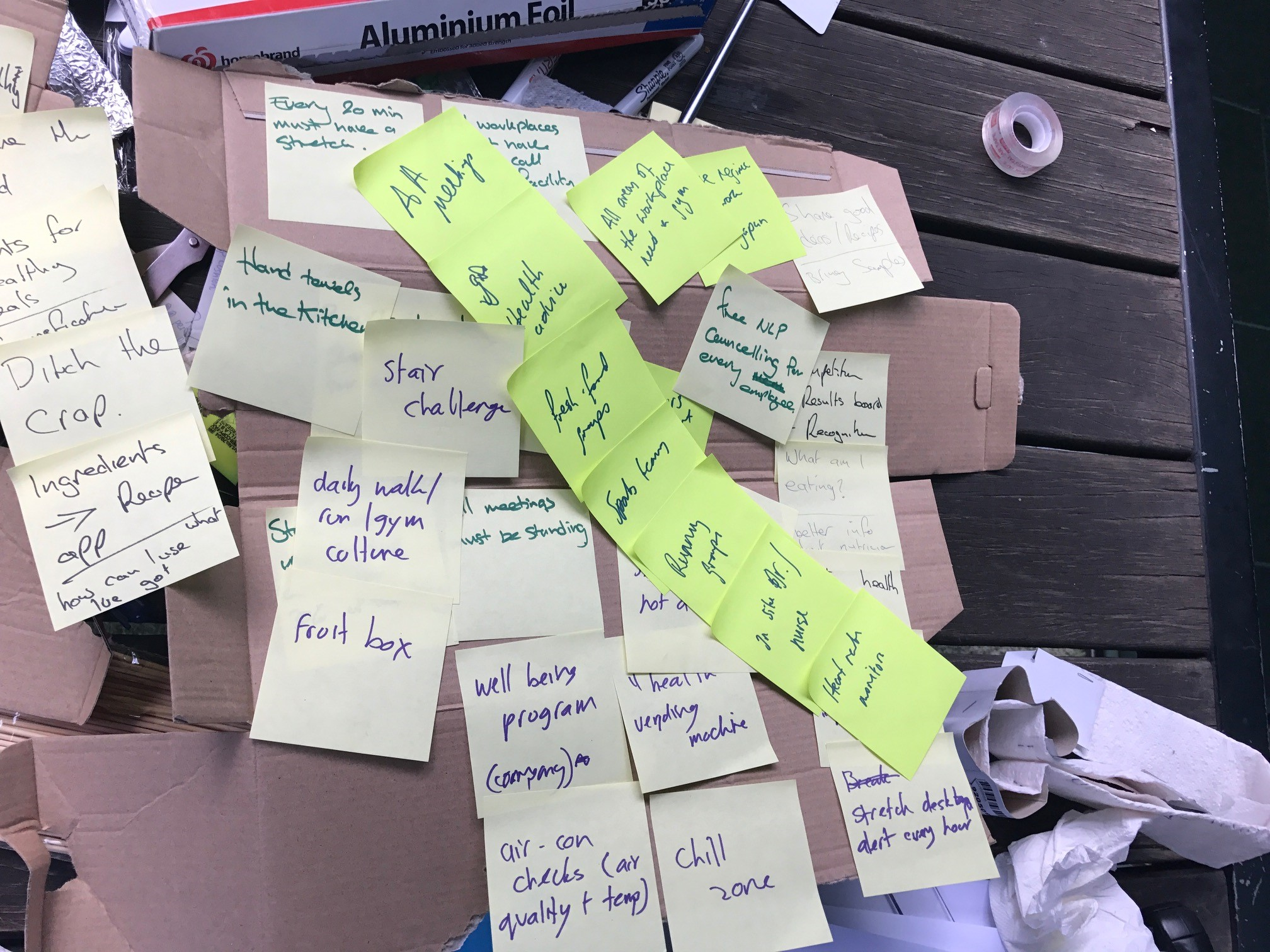
A group of people write ideas on sticky notes as part of a brainstorming session.

Brainstorming is a creativity technique in which a group of people interact to suggest ideas spontaneously in response to a prompt. Stress is typically placed on the volume and variety of ideas, including ideas that may seem outlandish or "off-the-wall". Ideas are noted down during the activity, but not assessed or critiqued until later. The absence of criticism and assessment is intended to avoid inhibiting participants in their idea production. The term was popularized by advertising executive Alex Faickney Osborn in the classic work Applied Imagination (1953).

== History ==
In 1939, the American advertising executive Alex Faickney Osborn began developing methods for creative problem-solving. He was frustrated by employees' inability to develop creative ideas individually for ad campaigns. In response, he began hosting group-thinking sessions and discovered a significant improvement in the quality and quantity of ideas produced by employees. He first termed the process as organized ideation, but participants later came up with the term "brainstorm sessions", taking the concept after the use of "the brain to storm a problem".

During the period when Osborn made his concept, he started writing on creative thinking, and the first notable book where he mentioned the term brainstorming was How to Think Up (1942).

Osborn outlined his method in the subsequent book Your Creative Power (1948), in chapter 33, "How to Organize a Squad to Create Ideas".

One of Osborn's key recommendations was for all the members of the brainstorming group to be provided with a clear statement of the problem to be addressed prior to the actual brainstorming session. He also explained that the guiding principle is that the problem should be simple and narrowed down to a single target. Here, brainstorming is not believed to be effective in complex problems because of a change in opinion over the desirability of restructuring such problems. While the process can address the problems in such a situation, tackling all of them may not be feasible.

== Osborn's method ==
Flowchart for conducting a brainstorming session

=== Two principles ===
Osborn said that two principles contribute to "ideative efficacy":

1. Defer judgment;
2. Reach for quantity.

=== Four rules ===
Following these two principles were his four general rules of brainstorming, established with intention to:

- reduce social inhibitions among group members;
- stimulate idea generation;
- increase overall creativity of the group.

These four rules were:

1. Go for quantity: This rule is a way of enhancing divergent production, aiming at facilitation of problem solution through the maxim quantity breeds quality. The assumption is that the greater the number of ideas generated the bigger the chance of producing a radical and effective solution.
2. Withhold criticism: In brainstorming, criticism of ideas generated should be put 'on hold'. Instead, participants should focus on extending or adding to ideas, reserving criticism for a later 'critical stage' of the process. By suspending judgment, participants will feel free to generate unusual ideas.
3. Welcome wild ideas: To get a good long list of suggestions, wild ideas are encouraged. They can be generated by looking from new perspectives and suspending assumptions. These new ways of thinking might give better solutions.
4. Combine and improve ideas: As suggested by the slogan "1+1=3". It is believed to stimulate the building of ideas by a process of association.

=== Applications ===
Osborn said brainstorming should address a specific question; he held that sessions addressing multiple questions were inefficient.

Further, the problem must require the generation of ideas rather than judgment; he uses examples such as generating possible names for a product as proper brainstorming material, whereas analytical judgments such as whether or not to marry do not have any need for brainstorming.

=== Groups ===
Osborn envisioned groups of around 12 participants, including both experts and novices. Participants are encouraged to provide wild and unexpected answers. Ideas receive no criticism or discussion. The group simply provide ideas that might lead to a solution and apply no analytical judgment as to the feasibility. The judgments are reserved for a later date.

== Variations ==
=== Nominal group technique ===
Participants are asked to write their ideas anonymously. Then the facilitator collects the ideas and the group votes on each idea. The vote can be as simple as a show of hands in favor of a given idea. This process is called distillation.

After distillation, the top-ranked ideas may be sent back to the group or to subgroups for further brainstorming. For example, one group may work on the color required in a product. Another group may work on the size, and so forth. Each group will come back to the whole group for ranking the listed ideas. Sometimes ideas that were previously dropped may be brought forward again once the group has re-evaluated the ideas.

It is important that the facilitator is trained in this process before attempting to facilitate this technique. The group should be primed and encouraged to embrace the process. Like all team efforts, it may take a few practice sessions to train the team in the method before tackling the important ideas.

=== Group passing technique ===
Each person in a circular group writes down one idea, and then passes the piece of paper to the next person, who adds some thoughts. This continues until everybody gets their original piece of paper back. By this time, it is likely that the group will have extensively elaborated on each idea.

The group may also create an "idea book" and post a distribution list or routing slip to the front of the book. On the first page is a description of the problem. The first person to receive the book lists their ideas and then routes the book to the next person on the distribution list. The second person can log new ideas or add to the ideas of the previous person. This continues until the distribution list is exhausted. A follow-up "read out" meeting is then held to discuss the ideas logged in the book. This technique takes longer, but it allows individuals time to think deeply about the problem.

=== Team idea mapping method ===
This method of brainstorming works by the method of association. It may improve collaboration and increase the quantity of ideas, and is designed so that all attendees participate and no ideas are rejected.

The process begins with a well-defined topic. Each participant brainstorms individually, then all the ideas are merged onto one large idea map. During this consolidation phase, participants may discover a common understanding of the issues as they share the meanings behind their ideas. During this sharing, new ideas may arise by the association, and they are added to the map as well. Once all the ideas are captured, the group can prioritize and/or take action.

=== Directed brainstorming ===
Directed brainstorming is a variation of electronic brainstorming (described below). It can be done manually or with computers. Directed brainstorming works when the solution space (that is, the set of criteria for evaluating a good idea) is known prior to the session. If known, those criteria can be used to constrain the ideation process intentionally.

In directed brainstorming, each participant is given one sheet of paper (or electronic form) and told the brainstorming question. They are asked to produce one response and stop, then all of the papers (or forms) are randomly swapped among the participants. The participants are asked to look at the idea they received and to create a new idea that improves on that idea based on the initial criteria. The forms are then swapped again and respondents are asked to improve upon the ideas, and the process is repeated for three or more rounds.

In the laboratory, directed brainstorming has been found to almost triple the productivity of groups over electronic brainstorming.

=== Guided brainstorming ===
A guided brainstorming session is time set aside to brainstorm either individually or as a collective group about a particular subject under the constraints of perspective and time. This type of brainstorming removes all cause for conflict and constrains conversations while stimulating critical and creative thinking in an engaging, balanced environment.

Participants are asked to adopt different mindsets for pre-defined period of time while contributing their ideas to a central mind map drawn by a pre-appointed scribe. Having examined a multi-perspective point of view, participants seemingly see the simple solutions that collectively create greater growth. Action is assigned individually.

Following a guided brainstorming session participants emerge with ideas ranked for further brainstorming, research and questions remaining unanswered and a prioritized, assigned, actionable list that leaves everyone with a clear understanding of what needs to happen next and the ability to visualize the combined future focus and greater goals of the group nicely.

=== Individual brainstorming ===
Individual brainstorming is the use of brainstorming in solitary situations. It typically includes such techniques as free writing, free speaking, word association, and drawing a mind map, which is a visual note taking technique in which people diagram their thoughts. Individual brainstorming is a useful method in creative writing and has been shown to be superior to traditional group brainstorming.

=== Question brainstorming ===
This process involves brainstorming the questions, rather than trying to come up with immediate answers and short-term solutions. The focus on different inquiries creates perspectives which may address the problem. Theoretically, this technique should not inhibit participation as there is no need to provide solutions. The answers to the questions form the framework for constructing future action plans. Once the list of questions is set, it may be necessary to prioritize them to reach to the best solution in an orderly way.

The portmanteau questorming is another term for this mode of inquiry.

== Methods to improving brainstorming sessions ==
Groups can improve the effectiveness and quality of their brainstorming sessions in a number of ways.

- Avoid face-to-face groups: Using face-to-face groups can increase production blocking, evaluation apprehension, social matching and social loafing.
- Stick to the rules: Brainstorming rules should be followed, and feedback should be given to members that violate these rules. Violations of brainstorming rules tend to lead to mediocre ideas.
- Pay attention to everyone's ideas: People tend to pay more attention to their own ideas, however brainstorming requires exposure to the ideas of others. A method to encourage members to pay attention to others' ideas is to make them list the ideas out or ask them to repeat others' ideas.
- Include both individual and group approaches: One method that helps members integrate their ideas into the group is brainwriting. This is where members write their ideas on a piece of paper and then pass it along to others who add their own ideas.
- Take breaks: Allow silence during group discussions so that members have time to think things through.
- Do not rush: Allow plenty of time for members to complete the task. Although working under pressure tends to lead to more solutions initially, the quality is usually lower than if more time is spent on the task.
- Stay persistent: Members should stay focused and persist at the task even when productivity is low.
- Facilitate the session: A skilled discussion leader should lead and coordinate the brainstorming sessions. This leader can motivate members, correct mistakes, and provide a clear standard of work. They can also be used to keep track of all the ideas and make sure that these ideas are available to everyone.

== Alternatives to brainstorming ==
If brainstorming does not work for a group, some alternatives are available:

- Buzzgroups: Larger groups can form subgroups that come up with ideas when the larger group is stumped. Afterwards, these subgroups come back together and discuss their ideas as a whole group.
- Bug list: Group members write down all the little problems or irritations concerning the issue they are working on, and then the group discusses solutions for each of these "bugs".
- Stepladder technique: A method where new members state their ideas before listening to the group's position.
- Synectics: A leader guides the group and discusses their goals, wishes, and frustrations using analogies, metaphors, and fantasy.
- TRIZ: This method is primarily used in science and engineering, and involves following a specific sequence of problem analysis, resource review, goal setting, and review of prior approaches to the problem.

== Electronic brainstorming ==
Although the brainstorming can take place online through commonly available technologies such as email or interactive web sites, there have also been many efforts to develop customized computer software that can either replace or enhance one or more manual elements of the brainstorming process.

Early efforts, such as GroupSystems at University of Arizona or Software Aided Meeting Management (SAMM) system at the University of Minnesota, took advantage of then-new computer networking technology, which was installed in rooms dedicated to computer supported meetings. When using these electronic meeting systems (EMS, as they came to be called), group members simultaneously and independently entered ideas into a computer terminal. The software collected (or "pools") the ideas into a list, which could be displayed on a central projection screen (anonymized if desired). Other elements of these EMSs could support additional activities such as categorization of ideas, elimination of duplicates, assessment and discussion of prioritized or controversial ideas. Later EMSs capitalized on advances in computer networking and internet protocols to support asynchronous brainstorming sessions over extended periods of time and in multiple locations.

Introduced along with the EMS by Nunamaker and colleagues at University of Arizona was electronic brainstorming (EBS). By utilizing customized computer software for groups (group decision support systems or groupware), EBS can replace face-to-face brainstorming. An example of groupware is the GroupSystems, a software developed by University of Arizona. After an idea discussion has been posted on GroupSystems, it is displayed on each group member's computer. As group members simultaneously type their comments on separate computers, those comments are anonymously pooled and made available to all group members for evaluation and further elaboration.

Compared to face-to-face brainstorming, not only does EBS enhanced efficiency by eliminating travelling and turn-taking during group discussions, it also excluded several psychological constraints associated with face-to-face meetings. Identified by Gallupe and colleagues, both production blocking (reduced idea generation due to turn-taking and forgetting ideas in face-to-face brainstorming) and evaluation apprehension (a general concern experienced by individuals for how others in the presence are evaluating them) are reduced in EBS. These positive psychological effects increase with group size. A perceived advantage of EBS is that all ideas can be archived electronically in their original form, and then retrieved later for further thought and discussion. EBS also enables much larger groups to brainstorm on a topic than would normally be productive in a traditional brainstorming session.

Computer supported brainstorming may overcome some of the challenges faced by traditional brainstorming methods. For example, ideas might be "pooled" automatically, so that individuals do not need to wait to take a turn, as in verbal brainstorming. Some software programs show all ideas as they are generated (via chat room or e-mail). The display of ideas may cognitively stimulate brainstormers, as their attention is kept on the flow of ideas being generated without the potential distraction of social cues such as facial expressions and verbal language. EBS techniques have been shown to produce more ideas and help individuals focus their attention on the ideas of others better than a brainwriting technique (participants write individual written notes in silence and then subsequently communicate them with the group). The production of more ideas has been linked to the fact that paying attention to others' ideas leads to non-redundancy, as brainstormers try to avoid to replicate or repeat another participant's comment or idea. Conversely, the production gain associated with EBS was less found in situations where EBS group members focused too much on generating ideas that they ignored ideas expressed by others. The production gain associated with GroupSystem users' attentiveness to ideas expressed by others has been documented by Dugosh and colleagues. EBS group members who were instructed to attend to ideas generated by others outperformed those who were not in terms of creativity.

According to a meta-analysis comparing EBS to face-to-face brainstorming conducted by DeRosa and colleagues, EBS has been found to enhance both the production of non-redundant ideas and the quality of ideas produced. Despite the advantages demonstrated by EBS groups, EBS group members reported less satisfaction with the brainstorming process compared to face-to-face brainstorming group members.

Some web-based brainstorming techniques allow contributors to post their comments anonymously through the use of avatars. This technique also allows users to log on over an extended time period, typically one or two weeks, to allow participants some "soak time" before posting their ideas and feedback. This technique has been used particularly in the field of new product development, but can be applied in any number of areas requiring collection and evaluation of ideas.

Some limitations of EBS include the fact that it can flood people with too many ideas at one time that they have to attend to, and people may also compare their performance to others by analyzing how many ideas each individual produces (social matching).

== Incentives ==
Some research indicates that incentives can augment creative processes. Participants were divided into three conditions. In Condition I, a flat fee was paid to all participants. In the Condition II, participants were awarded points for every unique idea of their own, and subjects were paid for the points that they earned. In Condition III, subjects were paid based on the impact that their idea had on the group; this was measured by counting the number of group ideas derived from the specific subject's ideas. Condition III outperformed Condition II, and Condition II outperformed Condition I at a statistically significant level for most measures. The results demonstrated that participants were willing to work far longer to achieve unique results in the expectation of compensation.

== Challenges to effective group brainstorming ==
A good deal of research refutes Osborn's claim that group brainstorming could generate more ideas than individuals working alone. For example, in a review of 22 studies of group brainstorming, Michael Diehl and Wolfgang Stroebe found that, overwhelmingly, groups brainstorming together produce fewer ideas than individuals working separately.

Several factors can contribute to a loss of effectiveness in group brainstorming.

- Production blocking: Because only one participant may give an idea at any one time, other participants might forget the idea they were going to contribute or not share it because they see it as no longer important or relevant. Further, if we view brainstorming as a cognitive process in which "a participant generates ideas (generation process) and stores them in short-term memory (memorization process) and then eventually extracts some of them from its short-term memory to express them (output process)", then blocking is an even more critical challenge because it may also inhibit a person's train of thought in generating their own ideas and remembering them. Group members can be given notepads to write their ideas on and the meeting can organize who will get to speak next. However, this brainstorming technique does not perform as well as individuals using the nominal group technique.
- Collaborative fixation: Exchanging ideas in a group may reduce the number of domains that a group explores for additional ideas. Members may also conform their ideas to those of other members, decreasing the novelty or variety of ideas, even though the overall number of ideas might not decrease.
- Evaluation apprehension: Evaluation apprehension was determined to occur only in instances of personal evaluation. If the assumption of collective assessment were in place, real-time judgment of ideas, ostensibly an induction of evaluation apprehension, failed to induce significant variance. Furthermore, when an authority figure watches the group members brainstorm the effectiveness lowers because members worry their ideas may be viewed negatively. Especially individuals with high social anxiety are particularly unproductive barnstormers and report feeling more nervous, anxious, and worried than group members who are less anxiety prone.
- Free-writing: Individuals may feel that their ideas are less valuable when combined with the ideas of the group at large. Indeed, Diehl and Stroebe demonstrated that even when individuals worked alone, they produced fewer ideas if told that their output would be judged in a group with others than if told that their output would be judged individually. However, experimentation revealed free-writing as only a marginal contributor to productivity loss, and type of session (i.e., real vs. nominal group) contributed much more.
- Personality characteristics: Extroverts have been shown to outperform introverts in computer mediated groups. Extroverts also generated more unique and diverse ideas than introverts when additional methods were used to stimulate idea generation, such as completing a small related task before brainstorming, or being given a list of the classic rules of brainstorming.
- Social matching: One phenomenon of group brainstorming is that participants will tend to alter their rate of productivity to match others in the group. This can lead to participants generating fewer ideas in a group setting than they would individually because they will decrease their own contributions if they perceive themselves to be more productive than the group average. On the other hand, the same phenomenon can also increase an individual's rate of production to meet the group average.
- Illusion of group productivity: Members tend to overestimate their group's productivity and so work less. Members of the group can only guess at the quantity and quality of their group's product and their personal contributions to the process but there is no standard to determine how well it is performing. A combination of processes explain why members are incorrectly overestimating productivity:
1. Group member(s) may intuitively mistake others' ideas for their own, and so when they think about their own performance they cognitively claim a few ideas that others actually suggested
2. Group members compare themselves to others who generate relatively few ideas, reassuring them that they are one of the high performers
3. Group brainstorming may "feel" more successful because participants rarely experience failure in a communal process. When individuals are trying to think creatively alone, people repeatedly find that they are unable to come up with a new idea. In a group setting, people are less likely to experience this failure in their search for new ideas because others' ideas are being discussed.

== See also ==
- Amygdala hijack
- 6-3-5 Brainwriting
- Affinity diagram
- Chief idea officer
- Group concept mapping
- Eureka effect
- Lateral thinking
- Mass collaboration
- Nominal group technique
- Thinking outside the box
- What? Where? When?

== Bibliography ==
- Osborn, Alex F. (1953). Applied Imagination: Principles and Procedures of Creative Problem Solving. New York: Charles Scribner's Sons, 1953. OCLC 641122686
