= Chief idea officer =

Executive role focused on ideation and creativity management

A chief idea officer (CIdO) is a C-suite executive responsible for systematically driving creative thinking, evaluating ideas, and establishing structured environments for front end innovation within an organization.

Unlike traditional innovation roles focused on execution, the CIdO operates upstream in the innovation management process, serving as a curator of high-potential ideas before they enter the development pipeline.

== History ==
The role emerged in the early 2000s, primarily within advertising and marketing agencies. One of the earliest documented uses was at Grey Worldwide's Dallas-Fort Worth branch in 2001. Roy Spence, co-founder of advertising firm GSD&M, held the title in the mid-2000s.

Andrew Jaffe, a veteran advertising journalist and longtime Adweek editorial director who later helped steer the Clio Awards wrote about the role of the chief idea officer in agencies in 2003. In his book Casting for Big Ideas (2003), Jaffe sketches the chief idea officer as a new kind of leader agency networks “may need to recruit and train,” distinct from both a knowledge-management officer and the technology-focused chief information officer.

In an Oct. 15, 2007 story on building innovative cultures, The Christian Science Monitor framed “chief idea officer” as one of several emerging C-suite titles, alongside Chief Innovation Officer and Chief Creative Officer, that “progressive firms” were adopting to signal a fresh, organization-wide commitment to idea generation and creativity.

In a 2009 engineering-education study, Jordan and Pereira used "chief idea officer" not as a corporate title but as a defined student team role responsible for leading brainstorming and ensuring that every teammate's ideas were surfaced and considered in the final design.

The role has since expanded beyond creative industries into an innovation leadership position around the world. In 2023, venture capital fund Team8 appointed a Chief Ideation Officer, while Singapore B2B firm Really Singapore appointed a Chief Ideas Officer for digital engagement strategies.

The Chief Idea/Ideas officers is distinct from Chief IDEA/IDEAS Officer which is a DEI leadership role whose acronym often stands for Inclusion, Diversity, Equity, and Access/Accessibility (and sometimes “Strategies” or “Sustainability”).

== Responsibilities ==
The chief idea officer's core responsibilities include:

- Fostering a culture of creativity – Creating environments where experimentation and intelligent risk-taking are encouraged
- Trendspotting – Monitoring emerging signals and technologies to identify opportunities and threats
- Idea management – Building systematic processes for generating, evaluating, and prioritizing ideas
- Cross-functional integration – Orchestrating collaboration across departments such as R&D, product management, marketing, and technology

== Distinction from Chief Innovation Officer ==
While the Chief Innovation Officer (CINO) focuses on executing and scaling validated ideas, the CIdO operates upstream, curating and selecting ideas before they enter the innovation funnel. In some organizations, the CIdO can also serve as a fractional executive, providing dedicated idea leadership without full-time commitment.

== In popular culture ==
In 2022, Midea Group, the Fortune Global 500 appliances company, featured the chief idea officer title in its first U.S. advertising campaign. The humorous campaign starred actor Sam Richardson of HBO's Veep as a fictional CIdO who takes credit for all Midea products, calling them "My Ideas" and claiming to be "the man behind the best ideas, at the world's best appliance company."

== Notable examples ==
- Jeremy Fojut – Co-founder of NEWaukee, a Milwaukee social innovation organization
- James Boettcher – Founder of Righteous Gelato (formerly Fiasco Gelato) in Canada
- Tim Galles – chief idea officer at Barkley, overseeing connection and innovation across strategy, design, and communications

== See also ==
- Chief innovation officer
- Chief creative officer
- Corporate title
- Creative industries
- Front end innovation
- Innovation management
