= Systematic inventive thinking =

Academic method for creative thinking

Systematic inventive thinking (SIT) is a thinking method developed in Israel in the mid-1990s. Derived from Genrich Altshuller's TRIZ engineering discipline, SIT is a practical approach to creativity, innovation and problem solving, which has become a well known methodology for innovation. At the heart of SIT's method is one core idea adopted from Genrich Altshuller's TRIZ which is also known as Theory of Inventive Problem Solving (TIPS): that inventive solutions share common patterns. Focusing not on what makes inventive solutions different – but on what they share in common – is core to SIT's approach.

== History of the SIT methodology ==
=== Overview – the creativity debate ===
SIT deals with two main areas of creativity: ideation of new ideas, and problem solving. In the 1970s, researchers from the field of Cognitive Psychology established a quantitative yardstick for measuring creativity: the creative person was defined as someone with a large flow of ideas. A high rate of ideas per unit of time was considered an indication of creativity. This approach led to a series of methods for developing creativity based on the assumption that a quantitative increase of ideas will necessarily bring about a qualitative improvement. Such widely known methods as brainstorming, synectics, random stimulation and lateral thinking (identified with Edward de Bono) can be traced to this approach. More recent studies reveal the appearance of a different approach. These studies show that the main difficulty faced by problem solvers is not generating a large quantity of ideas but coming up with original ones. The former parallel drawn between quantity and quality appears to no longer hold true. It was discovered that a large flow of ideas does not necessarily lead to the creation of original ones and further, that the very occupation with ordinary ideas may actually hamper creativity and innovative thought. These discoveries have prompted a new approach which holds that original and interesting results stem from organized thinking and structured processes rather than the random generation of ideas. One of the characteristics of organized thinking is a state of "low stimuli", unencumbered by a large quantity of ideas. In this approach, originality replaces quantity as a dominant criterion. This organized or structured approach to idea generation is the starting point for systematic inventive thinking.

=== The TRIZ heritage ===
SIT is a descendant of the work of Genrich Altshuller, a Russian engineer who analyzed over 200,000 patents to identify the 40 common inventive principles of his unique formula, named TRIZ. Altshuller's main discovery was that creative solutions incorporate the elimination of a conflict in the problem state. A conflict is a state where one parameter must be changed, in order to get some benefit, but changing that parameter causes a deterioration of another important parameter. Routine engineering design deals with this situation by searching for the "best fit" compromise, a trade off that maximized the utility and minimizes the negative impact of a specific configuration of the variance of the available input parameters.

Altshuller found that the engineering conflicts can be indexed according to the type of parameters involved (39 common engineering parameters were initially defined).

Examining numerous inventions made it possible to assign each conflict with a set of possible hints or strategies on how to approach the solution to the problem. Three types of hints are used: principles, standards and physical effects. There are 40 principles; each help with defining high-level strategies for solving the problem. There are 70 standards, which are more elaborated ideas based on collective past solutions. There is a knowledge base of approximately 400 physical effects ranging across physical, chemical, and geometrical aspects, indexed according to the functions that each effect can carry out.

During the 1970s, one of Altshuller's students, Ginadi Filkovsky, immigrated to Israel and joined the Open University in Tel Aviv. He began teaching TRIZ and adapting it to the needs of both Israeli and international hi-tech companies. A number of key academics were involved in this research.

Two Ph.D. students, Jacob Goldenberg and Roni Horowitz, joined Filkovsky, focusing their research on developing and simplifying the methodology. Their work formed the basis of the SIT method as it exists today. Both TRIZ and SIT share a basic assumption - that one can study existing creative ideas in a field, identify common logical patterns in these ideas, translate the patterns into a set of Thinking Tools, and then apply these Thinking Tools to generate new creative ideas. In spite of the commonalities, SIT strongly differs from TRIZ in several important respects, having to do mainly with its practical application.

=== From TRIZ to SIT ===
The move from TRIZ to SIT was motivated by the desire to create a method that is easier to learn and retain (achieved through a smaller number of rules and tools), more universal in application (achieved through elimination of engineering specific tools) and tighter in keeping the problem solver within a real inventive framework (the Closed World principle). TRIZ also favors using existing resources for solving a problem. But in contrast to SIT, this principle is scattered around the method. It can be found in the principle of Ideal Final Result ("the best system is when there is no system" – Altshuller). The difference between TRIZ and SIT in this respect is that in SIT the Closed World condition is the most important principle. This is particularly applicable when the template approach is applied to problem solving. The first step in using SIT for Problem Solving is to define the problem world. Once defined, the problem solver knows that all the building blocks for the solution are right there in front of them and that the solution simply requires the reorganization of the existing objects. This adds great focus and power to the method. It also turns every real problem into an amusing puzzle.

== Five thinking tools ==
=== 1. Subtraction ===
Remove an essential component from a product and find uses for the newly envisioned arrangement of the existing components. This abstracted arrangement is known as a "virtual product".

=== 2. Multiplication ===
Add to a product a component of the same type as an existing component. The added component should be changed in some way. The 2 keywords for this tool are: 1) more and 2) different. These represent the two stages for applying the tool: 1) add more copies of something that exists in the product and 2) change those copies according to some parameter.

=== 3. Division ===
Divide the product and/or its components and rearrange them to form a new product. Using this tool forces consideration of different structures, either on the level of the product/service as a whole, or on the level of an individual component. Dividing a product to many pieces gives the freedom to reconstruct it in many new ways – it increases our degrees of freedom for working with the situation.

=== 4. Task unification ===
Assign a new and additional task to an existing resource. Less affluent cultures are more likely to adopt the Task Unification mindset. For example, the Bedouins use camels for a number of different tasks: transportation, currency, milk, skin for tents, shade, protection from the wind, burning feces for fuel. More affluent societies tend to jettison resources.

=== 5. Attribute dependency ===
Creating and dissolving dependencies between variables of a product. Attribute dependency works with variables rather than components. Variables are easy to identify as those characteristics that can change within a product or component (e.g. color, size, material).

== Principles ==
=== The closed world – thinking inside the box ===
The closed-world condition is crucial to SIT's methodology. The first step in using SIT is to define the problem world. Once defined, the problem solver knows that all the building blocks for the solution are right there in front of him and that the solution simply requires the reorganization of the existing objects. This adds great focus and power to the method. It also can turn every real problem into an amusing puzzle. The closed-world condition deals with the resemblance between the problem world and the solution world. The condition stipulates that in the development of a new product – or when addressing a problem – one must utilize only elements already existing in the product/problem, or in the immediate environment. This condition forces reliance on resources already at our disposal, rather than "importing" new external resources for the solution. The closed-world condition often provokes resistance as it runs counter to some of the most common intuitions about creative thinking, especially the ubiquitous notion of "thinking out of the box". The essential claim of "thinking out of the box" is that in order to produce ideas that are new and different, you need to somehow move beyond normal thinking patterns, to a universe located outside the metaphorical box. The closed-world condition, by contrast, forces the thinker to find a creative solution by heavily limiting the space of possibilities. Since the scope of possibilities is artificially limited there is no choice but to reconsider the relations between elements found within the problem and pay closer attention to them: their arrangement in space and time; their assigned functions and their necessity. Thus, the closed-world condition sets us on a collision course with our fixedness, allowing us to arrive at solutions which are both innovative (different from the usual) and simple (since based on existing and known elements).

=== Qualitative change ===
The qualitative-change principle dictates that solutions can be found where the main problem element or variable in the existing situation is either totally eliminated or even reversed. In other words, a problematic element in a situation is neutralized, so it no longer presents an obstacle. It can also be the case that the problematic element becomes a key positive factor; the situation is "reversed", and the disadvantage transforms into an advantage.

=== Function follows form ===
A term coined by Ronald Finke, "function follows form" is often considered a "backwards" process in that the starting point for thinking of new ideas is the existing resource base rather than specific needs that have been identified in the market. These needs, however, are never ignored – they are simply introduced at a later stage. The process begins with an existing product (or service), continues with manipulating it systematically to create what SIT calls a "virtual product" (this is the form) and only then examines whether it satisfies existing or potential customer needs (function). The "function follows form" principle is applied as an overarching framework to focus the application SIT's thinking tools.

=== Function follows form ===
Function follows form is a principle associated with classic architecture, and it is also being used in government buildings. The concept of this principle means design created according to a shape, but do not consider its function at initial stage of architectural design.

=== Path of most resistance ===
The human mind often relies on familiar ways of thinking. Systematic Inventive Thinking (SIT) is a method that directs people to move away from these common patterns by focusing on solutions that are not immediately obvious, this method aims to help users develop original ideas.

=== Cognitive fixedness ===
Cognitive fixedness is a state of mind in which an object or situation are perceived in one specific way, to the exclusion of any alternative. There are several types of fixedness, among them:

==== Functional fixedness ====
A term coined by the social scientist Karl Dunker. Functional fixedness is the tendency to ascribe specific functions to respective objects. Dunker sees functional fixedness as a "Mental block against using an object in a new way that is required to solve a problem", as described in his cognitive performance test, known as the candle problem.

==== Structural fixedness ====
This is the tendency to view objects as a whole, as a gestalt, which often makes it difficult to imagine how the product could be reorganized to look differently. For example, why do TV controls always have to be on the lower part of the TV set? Would it not be easier if they were on the upper part? When television sets were first introduced, the controls were potentiometers made out of wax. The heat that was emitted from the cathode-ray tubes, dispersing upwards would melt the controls had they been located on the upper part. Therefore, they were placed on the lower part. But since then, new generations of TV sets are available, and still one would find the controls on the lower part. This is structural fixedness.

=== Near far sweet ===
Most ideas for new products are either uninspired or impractical. Finding the "sweet spot" requires a balance that leads to both ingenious and viable ideas. This notion was expressed in a Harvard Business Review Article entitles "Finding Your Innovation Sweet Spot". When we innovate we push our thinking outward, trying to create something new and different from what we have now. Yet we do not want to wander too far off. A "great" idea must be executable and palatable. The NFS principle assures that our ideation will generate ideas that are sufficiently removed from our current situation in order to be interesting, while nevertheless close enough to our core competence in order to be feasible. The SIT thinking process uses the FFF procedure and the five thinking tools in order to generate new forms (virtual products). These forms if unrestrained might lead to "far" ideas. The "closed world" condition for example acts as an inhibitor, making sure we do not wander too far out. This combination of opposite forces keeps us ideating in the sweet zone.

== The template approach to new product development ==
SIT approaches new product development by identifying and applying certain well-defined schemes derived from a historical analysis of product-based trends, termed patterns or templates. These templates may contribute to the understanding and prediction of new product emergence. The invention of new products has traditionally involved methods that encourage the generation of large numbers of ideas. The notion that the rewards of generating a large number of ideas outweigh the costs can be traced back to early studies in the field. As this process tends to be highly complex and un-formalized, those involved in generating new ideas may seek ways to become more productive as they progress from one ideation task to another. Some may succeed in identifying patterns of the invention that are common to different contexts and apply them within a certain product category, or even try to apply them to other product categories. Individuals who adopt such a cognitive strategy may expect to gain an advantage over others who treat every task as new and unrelated to past ideation. However, even if they prove productive, the patterns are likely to be idiosyncratic and, quite often, not even verbally definable. As such, they lack permanence and generalizability. SIT sets are built on the thesis that certain patterns are identifiable, objectively verifiable, widely applied, and learnable, and that these patterns, termed templates, can serve as a facilitative tool that channels the ideation process, enabling the individual to be more productive and focused.

The usual process of developing new products begins with a definition of market need. This is done based on intuition or on market analysis, focus groups, etc. After defining the needs, a process is begun of developing products to address these needs. This process is called form follows function, as the form of the new product is derived from the function that it should fulfill. This process has a few disadvantages:

1. Most customers have difficulties in thinking about needs or products, which do not exist. This is particularly true for needs that are not vital. For example: how many customers thought of the need for a compact, transportable cassette player as addressed by Walkman? How many customers thought about the possibility to use Internet communication as a means to conduct telephone calls?
2. To find those customers which do think of new needs/products, huge and very expensive surveys are needed. But even if you succeed in finding those people, chances are they will not be keen to share their good ideas for free.
3. If the need is clear or easy to define, it is most likely that at least a few of your competitors have already defined it and are in the process of addressing the need.

In order to overcome these problems, the SIT method suggests starting the process of product development from the product itself. Applying systematic thinking tools in analyzing the product can lead to potential new products or to a definition of new needs. The advantages of this method are as follows:

1. The process requires only a limited number of hours and is conducted in-house.
2. Applying the method yields many new ideas and a definition of many potential new needs.
3. As the new products are based on the old ones, no major changes are usually required in production.

One of the important elements of SIT is to characterize the system and environmental variables. After having defined these variables, the participants are asked to examine the correlation between them, and to examine the impact of manipulating one or more of the product variables on the potential use of the "new" product; how such a change affects the correlation between the product and the environment and who may want to use such a product.

== SIT in universities and business schools ==
SIT is taught in numerous universities and business schools worldwide. The methodology is most often taught through programs on innovation, business administration, marketing, organizational development, leadership, management studies.

(ordered alphabetically)

- Bar Ilan University
- Ben-Gurion University of the Negev
- Brandeis University
- Brigham Young University
- Columbia University
- Duke University
- Harvard Business School
- Hebrew University of Jerusalem
- IMD - International Institute for Management Development
- Indiana University
- Interdisciplinary Center Herzliya
- INSEAD
- London Business School
- National University of Singapore
- Open University of Israel
- Shiv Nadar University
- Stanford University
- Technion – Israel Institute of Technology
- Tel Aviv University
- University of Innsbruck
- Universidad de Los Andes Bogota
- University of Cincinnati
- University of North Carolina at Charlotte
- University of Technology Sydney
- Visart, Budapest
- Wharton Business School
- University of Toronto
- York University

== See also ==
- TRIZ
- Unified structured inventive thinking
- Morphological analysis
- Systems theory
- Brainstorming
- Dimension time cost model
- C-K theory
- Lateral thinking
- Nine windows
- SCAMPER
