= Systematic Inventive Thinking (company) =

SIT – Systematic Inventive Thinking
- Type: Privately held company
- Industry: Consulting
- Founded: 1995; 31 years ago in Tel Aviv, Israel
- Founder: Amnon Levav, Haim Harduf, Haim Peres, Jacob Goldenberg, Roni Horowitz
- Headquarters: Tel Aviv, Israel
- Area served: Worldwide
- Key people: Udi Yerushalmi (CEO), Amnon Levav (CIO), Nurit Shalev (SVP), Yoni Stern (SVP), Hila Peles (CFO)
- Products: Consulting and training on business innovation within organizations
- Number of employees: 80–100 (2018)
- Website: www.sitsite.com

SIT (Systematic Inventive Thinking) is an Israeli privately owned consulting company. The company uses its proprietary Systematic Inventive Thinking methodology to help organizations achieve their objectives through innovation.

The company was founded in Tel Aviv, Israel in 1995, it has offices/affiliates in the UK, Australia, Chile, China, and Colombia.

== History ==
The TRIZ (Theory of Inventive Problem Solving) methodology developed by Genrich Altshuller was gaining worldwide recognition following the end of the Cold War. One of Altshuller's students, Ginadi Filkovsky began teaching TRIZ in Israel, adapting it to the needs of both Israeli and international hi-tech companies. Two of Filkovsky's students, Jacob Goldenberg and Roni Horowitz became passionate about TRIZ yet felt that it posed some challenges in its application. Together, they set about further developing and simplifying TRIZ's 40 principles. In 1995, their new version, coined Systematic Inventive Thinking (SIT), caught the attention of Amnon Levav, one of the managing editors of Status magazine. Levav brought on board Haim Peres, a local businessman and manager of the Symbol-Peres ad agency. Peres shared in Levav's enthusiasm and recognized that the SIT methodology had potential beyond its original use for problem-solving and could deliver value in marketing and management fields as well.

Later that year, SIT opened its main office in Tel Aviv, Israel, with Haim Peres as the first CEO. In 2000, Amnon Levav became CEO, a post he held until 2018 when he transitioned into the role of Chief Innovation Officer. Udi Yerushalmi is the current CEO of SIT. Additional offices have been opened in the UK, Australia, Chile, China, and Colombia.

== Inside the Box ==
The foundations of the SIT methodology, as a further development of the TRIZ methodology, are based on the idea that successful innovations share common patterns that rarely appear in failed innovations. These patterns were developed into five thinking tools that promote innovative thinking (Subtraction, Multiplication, Division, Task Unification and Attribute Dependency). The tools include step-by-step processes involving a series of thinking constraints, demonstrating some of the primary principles of the methodology – Constraints Foster Creativity and the Closed World – making use of existing resources. The first step in using the tools is to analyze an existing system by breaking it down into its components and relationships, then manipulate those relationships to see how they can be altered and expanded. It is this focus on utilizing internal resources as opposed to procuring external ones that birthed the term 'Thinking Inside the Box'.

== Products and Services ==
SIT works with companies in three modalities: facilitating, training, and consulting. Its main categories include Enhancing Organizational Creativity, Problem Solving, New Product Development, and Advertising. SIT facilitators guide the process by working together with a heterogenous team representing different facets of the client's business.

SIT has worked with companies on projects in the business, government, and NGO world. Global clients include Fortune 500 companies such as Bayer, Johnson & Johnson, Nestlé, and Philips. Some of its results include the Slimline Consumer Electronics design archetype as developed in collaboration with Philips for its DVD players; Daviplata, the first massive e-money platform in Latin America and winner of the HBR/McKinsey M-Prize; and the ROM chocolate campaign, winner of two Grand Prix awards at Cannes Lions International Festival of Creativity. In 2016 Bayer selected SIT as the focal methodology for its global network of Innovation Coaches.

== SIT Education ==
SIT is taught in university classes worldwide and as part of executive education programs. In 2017, the company launched its own e-learning site, the SIT Online Academy, which offers multiple educational courses for participants looking to acquire the tools and principles of the Systematic Inventive Thinking method.

== Research and publications ==
SIT and its affiliates have released numerous articles and books on the topic of Systematic Inventive Thinking. These include Cracking the Ad Code, a step-by-step guide for developing innovative advertisements, published by Cambridge University Press, and Inside the Box, a how-to manual for using the Systematic Inventive Thinking method, published by Simon and Schuster.

== See also ==
- Creative problem-solving
- Management science
- Six Thinking Hats
- Systematic inventive thinking
