= Inventive standard =

In TRIZ, inventive standards are a set of rules of synthesis and transformation of technical systems directly resulting from laws of evolution of these systems. As a rule, solving of a complex inventive problem is addressed to a combination of at least one TRIZ method and physical effect. Based on frequently used combinations of TRIZ methods and physical effects Genrich Altshuller proposed inventive standards.

== Current definition (TRIZ glossary) ==
According to the TRIZ Dictionary, an inventive standard is a problem-solving method that proposes a rule describing how to transform a given Su-Field in order to achieve the required result. The description of the rule consists of two parts: the left part presents an existing Su-Field that has to be improved (a generic model of a problem), and the right part presents a Su-Field that implements such an improvement (a generic model of a solution).

== Ontology Diagram ==
The following picture presents the ontology diagram of Inventive standard concept.

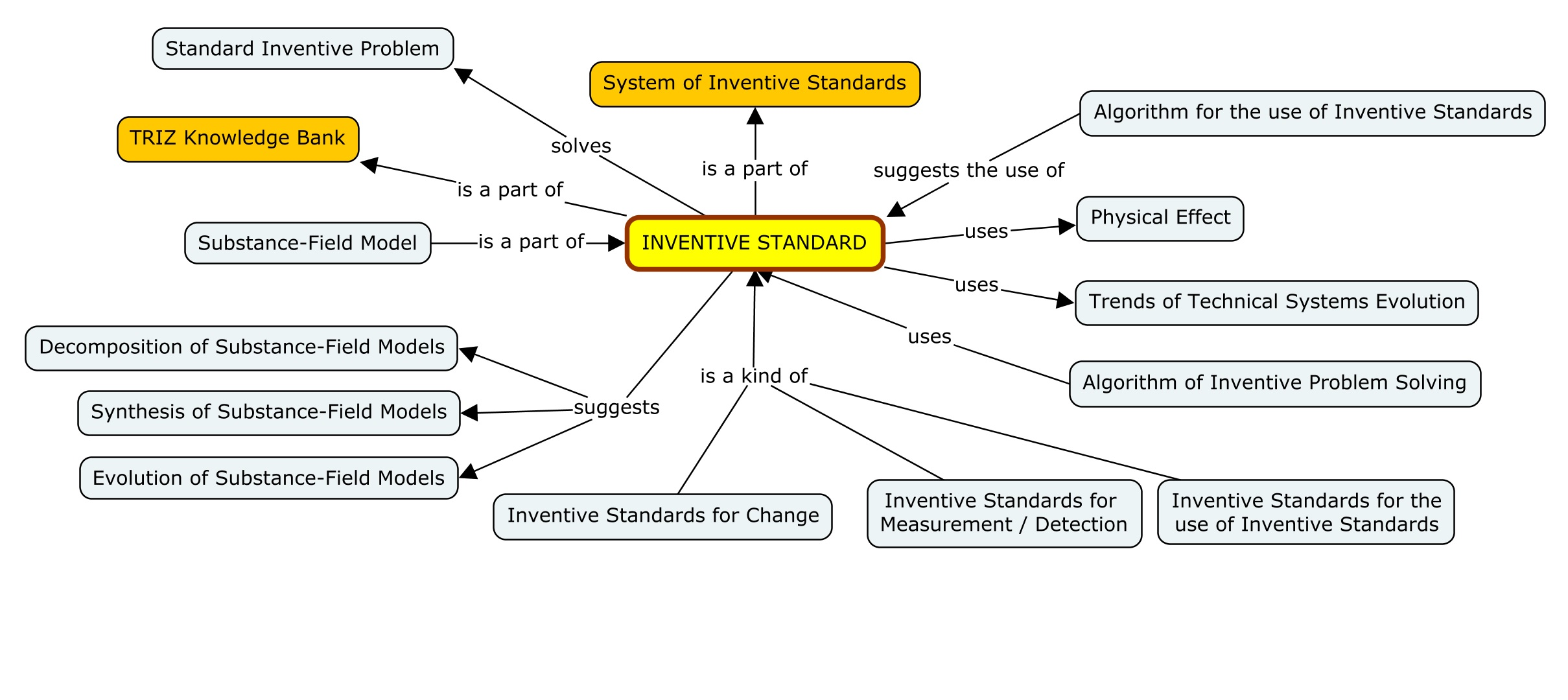

== Related TRIZ terms (on the diagram) ==
Standard Inventive Problem

Substance-Field Model

TRIZ method (?)

Physical Effect
