= Design theory (disambiguation) =

Design theory is a subfield of design research concerned with various theoretical approaches.

Design theory may also refer to:

- Engineering and industrial design
  - C-K theory
- Design science
  - C-K theory
- Mathematics
  - Combinatorial design
  - Block design (including symmetric designs)
  - Design of experiments
- Architecture
- Economics
  - Mechanism design
- Theological argument
  - Intelligent design
