= Laws of technical systems evolution =

Outlining trends of technical evolution

The laws of technical systems evolution are the most general evolution trends for technical systems formulated by TRIZ author G. S. Altshuller after reviewing thousands USSR invention authorship certificates and foreign patent abstracts.

Altshuller studied the way technical systems have been invented, developed and improved over time. He discovered several evolutionary trends that help engineers to anticipate improvements that are most likely to make it advantageous. Convergence to ideality is the most important of these laws. There are two concepts of ideality: ideality as a leading pathway of a technical system's evolution, and ideality as a synonym of "ideal final result", which is one of the basic TRIZ concepts.

== History ==
Studying paths of evolution of technical systems has been a primary research method of TRIZ since its inception. Until the 1970s however the discovered recurrent patterns of evolution were not consolidated into a separate section of TRIZ and were scattered among other sections. In the 1970s Altshuller consolidated them into a new section of TRIZ that he called "the laws of technical systems evolution". It included both previously discovered recurrent patterns of evolution and newly discovered ones. Studying "laws of evolution" became an independent research topic in TRIZ.

The following authors, besides Altshuller, contributed most to it:

- Yuri Khotimlyansky: studied patterns of energy conductivity in technical systems;
- Vladimir Asinovsky: proposed principles of correspondence of various components of technical systems;
- Yevgeny Karasik: co-authored with Altshuller the law of transition from a macro-level to a micro-level, introduced the notion of dual technical systems and studied the patterns of their evolution.

== Definition of laws ==
=== System of laws ===
In his pioneering work of 1975, Altshuller subdivided all laws of technical systems evolution into 3 categories:

- Statics: describes criteria of viability of newly created technical systems.
- Kinematics: defines how technical systems evolve regardless of conditions.
- Dynamics: defines how technical systems evolve under specific conditions.

=== Static laws ===
- The law of the completeness of the parts of the system

Any working system must have 4 parts: the engine, the transmission, the working unit (working organ) and the control element (organ of steering). The engine generates the needed energy, the transmission guides this energy to the working unit, which ensures contact with outside world (processed object), and the control element makes the system adaptable.

- The law of energy conductivity of the system

As every technical system is a transformer of energy, this energy should circulate freely and efficiently through its 4 main parts (engine, transmission, working element and control element). The transfer of energy can be by substance, field, or substance-field.

- The law of harmonizing the rhythms of parts of the system

The frequencies of vibration, or the periodicity of parts and movements of the system should be in synchronization with each other.

=== Kinematic laws ===
- Law of increasing the degree of ideality of the system

The ideality of a system is a qualitative ratio between all desirable benefits of the system and its cost or other harmful effects. When trying to decide how to improve a given invention, one naturally would attempt to increase ideality, either to increase beneficial features or else to decrease cost or reduce harmful effects. The ideal final result would have all the benefits at zero cost. That cannot be achieved; the law states, however, that successive versions of a technical design usually increase ideality. Ideality = benefits/(cost + harm)

- The law of uneven development of parts of a system

A technical system encompasses different parts, which will evolve differently, leading to the new technical and physical contradictions.

- The law of transition to a super-system

When a system exhausts the possibilities of further significant improvement, it's included in a super-system as one of its parts. As a result new development of the system become possible.

=== Dynamic laws ===
- Transition from macro to micro level

The development of working organs proceeds at first on a macro and then a micro level. The transition from macro to micro level is one of the main (if not the main) tendency of the development of modern technical systems. Therefore in studying the solution of inventive problems, special attention should be paid to examining the "macro to micro transition" and the physical effects which have brought this transition about.

- Increasing the S-Field involvement

Non-S-field systems evolve to S-field systems. Within the class of S-field systems, the fields evolve from mechanical fields to electro-magnetic fields. The dispersion of substances in the S-field increases. The number of links in the S-fields increases, and the responsiveness of the whole system tends to increase.

== Patterns of evolution ==
The patterns of evolution were developed by Altshuller as a set of patterns common to systems as they are developed and as they acquire new features. They are used in systems development and apply to all systems and are used for education, software, economics, business.

1. Evolution of useful functions
2. Elimination of harmful functions
3. Evolution of applications
4. Integration/Structuralisation
5. Increasing dynamicity and controllability
6. Evolution of matching/mismatching
7. Evolution of resource application
8. Evolution of contradictions
9. Evolution of processes in system
10. Evolution of fields
11. Evolution toward the multilevel
