= Valentina Zhuravlyova =

Soviet science fiction writer, 1933–2004

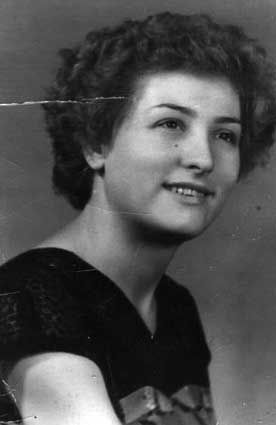
- Born: 17 July 1933; Baku, Azerbaijani SSR, Soviet Union
- Died: 12 March 2004 (aged 70); Petrozavodsk, Karelia, Russia
- Education: Baku Medical Institute
- Occupation: Writer
- Spouse: Genrich Altshuller
- Writing career
- Language: Russian

Valentina Nikolayevna Zhuravlyova (Russian: Валентина Николаевна Журавлёва, July 17, 1933 – March 12, 2004) was a Soviet science fiction writer born in Baku, Azerbaijan.

Valentina Zhuravlyova was the wife of Genrich Altshuller, the inventor of TRIZ and a science fiction writer himself. They wrote many stories together, but because of antisemitic restrictions, they were published under the single name of Valentina Zhuravlyova.
