= Unified structured inventive thinking =

Unified Structured Inventive Thinking (USIT) is a structured, problem-solving methodology for finding innovative solution concepts to engineering-design type problems. Historically, USIT is related to Systematic Inventive Thinking (SIT), which originated in Israel and is related to TRIZ, the Russian methodology. It differs from TRIZ in several ways, but most importantly it is a simpler methodology, which makes it quicker to learn and easier to apply. It requires no databases or computer software. (But note that the purest application of TRIZ does not require databases or software either.)

The goal of USIT is to enable a problem solver to invent multiple solution concepts in as short a time as possible for real-world problems (day-to-day technical problems in all fields). Key to this methodology is its ability to establish, quickly, unusual perspectives of a problem situation. Innovative results are achieved using tools (heuristics) designed to elicit complementary contributions from both cerebral hemispheres, generating logical and creative concepts. USIT tools and methods began their development in the Ford Motor Company Research Laboratory in a training program called structured inventive thinking that continues to be taught and applied in Ford Motor Company worldwide engineering locations (see History and Industrial Experience).

== Introduction ==
Problem solving is most commonly used in professions such as, engineers, scientists, mathematicians, all of whom have academic degrees, and inventors who bear patents as proof to their talent.

Engineering and science are mostly based on an algorithmic-type of problem solving developed by applied mathematicians. Inventing is not an algorithmic process; it is a result of unrestricted creative thinking—inspiration. Lacking in algorithmic processes, inventive-type problem solving methodology has eluded much of academia. Many methodologies have been developed and marketed for filling this gap. Though they may or may not involve algorithms, they often entail structured methodology. USIT has structure, but no algorithms.

== History ==
The methodology known as systematic inventive thinking (SIT), now known as advanced systematic thinking (ASIT), was brought into Ford Motor Company in 1995. Dr. Roni Horowitz and colleagues developed SIT in the early 1990s with the goal of simplifying TRIZ. It was introduced into Ford by Dr. Ed Sickafus who modified the methodology for adaptation into an automotive environment and named it "structured inventive thinking", retaining the acronym SIT in honor of the earlier work. In 1997, Ford Motor Company approved the publication of a textbook, Unified Structured Inventive Thinking – How to Invent by Dr. Ed. Sickafus.

Since 2000, USIT has been taught outside of the company to non-Ford interests. It has been introduced to individuals, companies, and institutions in Africa, Asia, the Americas, Australia, and Europe. A newsletter containing mini-lectures on USIT is sent to 43 countries and is translated into three languages (see Resources).

== Overview of USIT ==
It is recommended that one turn to USIT after conventional methodologies have waned. This encourages the rapid application of intuitive problem solving called brainstorming (in which technologists excel) and the quick collection of "low hanging fruit". It also sets the stage for beginning unconventional methodology that stresses left-brain/right-brain participation in problem solving (logic/creativity).

USIT fits between problem identification and the selection of solution concepts found for a problem; both involve engineering and business decisions. Between these engineering-filtering events, a problem solver is free of such filters while searching solution concepts to be engineered. USIT emphasizes this distinct division enabling a problem solver to spend time focused on creative thinking without psychologically inhibiting filters—a problem simplification strategy.

All aspects of USIT are derived from a unifying theory based on three fundamental components: objects, attributes, and the effects they support. Effects may be beneficial, called "functions", or not beneficial, called "unwanted effects".

The methodology consists of three common phases: "problem definition", "problem analysis", and "application of solution concepts" with equal time spent in each phase.

Problem definition
A well-defined problem is formulated in an iterative process, described in terms of objects, attributes, and a single unwanted effect. Objects are reduced to a minimum number required to contain the problem (not to "explain" the problem situation). Multiple root causes are discovered using the plausible root causes heuristic. Abstraction of the problem statement is achieved using verbal and graphic metaphors. Exercise of the "plausible root causes heuristic" carries the problem solver well into problem analysis.

Problem analysis
Following plausible root causes analysis one of two lines of thinking is followed: 1) a "closed-world" analysis of the problem to understand intended functional connectivity of objects when no problem existed or 2) a "particles method" that begins from an ideal solution and works back to the problem situation.

Solution techniques
Three strategies for problem solving are based on the metaphorical interaction of objects, attributes, and effects: "utilization", "nullification", and "elimination" of the unwanted effect (see Heuristics for Solving Technical Problems — Theory, Derivation, Application).

object – attribute

\
effect – attribute – object
/

object – attribute

Graphic metaphor for the interaction of objects and attributes.

Five solution heuristics are used to support these strategies.

1) "Dimensionality" focuses on the "attributes" available and new ones discovered during problem analysis.

2) "Pluralization" focuses on "objects" being multiplied in number or divided into parts, used in different ways, and carried to extremes.

3) "Distribution" focuses on "functions" being distributed differently among objects in the problem situation.

4) "Transduction" uses "attribute-function-attribute links" to reach new solution concepts. This is modeled metaphorically after transducers, which convert information from one form to another.

5) "Uniqueness" characterizes effects of a problem according to their activity in "space" and "time". Each technique is logically tied to one or more of the underlying features in the well-defined problem: objects, attributes, and effects.

== Industrial experience ==
Beginning in 1995, the problem-solving methodology has been taught to Ford's corporate technologists and management in monthly three-day classes. Weekly User-group meetings allow continued development of skills. A team of specialists was organized to apply the methodology to corporate problems worldwide. Their ideal goal was three 3-hour sessions, one for each phase of problem solving. Before starting a team program, the customer would be involved with the team in gathering necessary background information. Some of this experience can be read in Injecting Creative Thinking Into Product Flow (see Resources).

Many Japanese companies are having their technologists trained in USIT, especially because of its streamlined nature and ease of understanding.

A reward of USIT is its ability to enable a technologist to begin solving a problem so poorly worded as, "This gismo doesn't work. Fix it!" and, "Our competition just lowered their price. Now what?"

== Resources ==
- Triz Home Page in Japan a provides freeley available case studies, forums, ebooks and newsletters on USIT and reprints of papers and essays. The site is available in two languages: Japanese and English.

=== Textbook ===
- "Unified Structured Inventive Thinking – How to Invent (click on Publications)" by Dr. Ed. N. Sickafus, ISBN 0-9659435-0-X, Ntelleck, LLC, 1997

=== Ebooks ===
- "Unified Structured Inventive Thinking – an Overview"

=== Newsletter ===
- Korean

=== Reprints/essays ===
- "Injecting Creative Thinking Into Product Flow"
- "Problem Statement"
- "Metaphorical Observations"
