= Eswaran Subrahmanian =

Indian academic

Eswaran Subrahmanian (known as "Sub") is a cross-disciplinary computer scientist and engineering design theorist, working at Carnegie Mellon University and the National Institute of Standards and Technology. He is also a visiting honorary professor at the International Institute of Information Technology, Bangalore.

Together with Yoram Reich and Sruthi Krishnan, he coauthored We Are Not Users: Dialogue, Diversity, and Design in 2020, edited several books, as well as numerous papers on design theory and practice, emphasizing its participatory and pluralistic aspects.

== Honors and awards ==
Subrahmanian is an AAAS Fellow, ACM Distinguished Member, and a Fellow of The Design Society.
