= DXplain =

Clinical decision support system

DXplain is a Clinical decision support system (CDSS) available through the World Wide Web that assists clinicians by generating stratified diagnoses based on user input of patient signs and symptoms, laboratory results, and other clinical findings. Evidential support for each differential diagnosis is presented, along with recommended follow-up that may be conducted by the clinician to arrive at a more definitive diagnosis. The system also serves as a clinician reference with a searchable database of diseases and clinical manifestations.

== History ==
Designed by the Laboratory of Computer Science at the Massachusetts General Hospital, work on DXplain began in 1984 with a first version being released in 1986.

== Educational tool ==
Use of DXplain as a tool for medical consultation has been common to some institutions since it fills a gap, particularly for medical students in clinical rotations, that is not adequately covered by textbook literature. The system's large knowledge base combined with its ability to formulate diagnostic hypotheses have made it a popular education tool for US-based medical schools; by 2005, DXplain was supporting more than 33,189 total users.

== Methodology ==
DXplain generates ranked differential diagnoses using a pseudo-probabilistic algorithm. Each clinical finding entered into DXplain is assessed by determining the importance of the finding and how strongly the finding supports a given diagnosis for each disease in the knowledge base. Using this criterion, DXplain generates ranked differential diagnoses with the most likely diseases yielding the lowest rank. Using stored information regarding each disease’s prevalence and significance, the system differentiates between common and rare diseases.

== Accuracy ==
Analysis of accuracy has shown promise in DXplain and similar clinical decision support systems. In a preliminary trial investigation of 46 benchmark cases with a variety of diseases and clinical manifestations, the ranked differential diagnoses generated by DXplain were shown to be in alignment with a panel of five board-certified physicians. In another study investigating how well decision support systems work at responding to a bioterrorism event, an evaluation of 103 consecutive internal medicine cases showed that Dxplain correctly identified the diagnosis in 73% of cases, with the correct diagnosis averaging a rank of 10.7.

DXplain tended to outperform generative AI in a small study.

== Clinical usage ==
Despite its usage in clinician training, similar to other clinical decision support systems, DXplain has not expanded beyond the research laboratory or medical training setting, due in part to a lack of support by clinicians in real-world settings.

== See also ==
- VisualDx
