= Armand Hatchuel =

French researcher and professor of management science

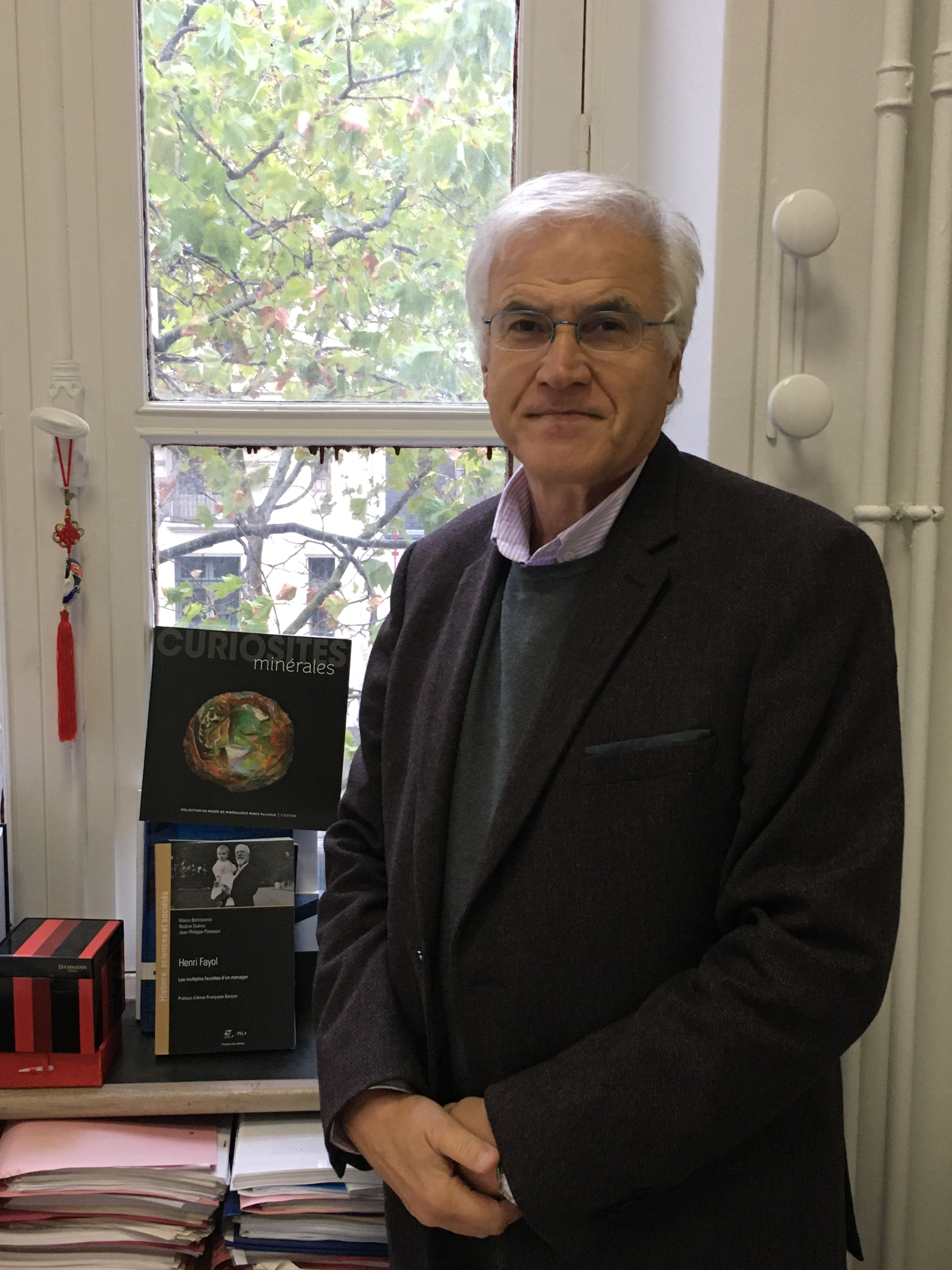
- Armand Hatchuel in his Mines office
- Born: January 29, 1952 (age 74)
- Education: PhD in Management Science, Mines ParisTech

Armand Hatchuel (born January 29, 1952) is a French researcher and professor of management science and design theory at the École des Mines de Paris, affiliated with its Centre for Management Science. His research explores cognitive and organizational dynamics in innovation and management. Hatchuel has also contributed to theoretical developments in the study of collective decision-making and innovation processes.

== Academic career ==
Armand Hatchuel graduated in 1973 with an engineering degree and continued his studies at École des Mines de Paris, completing a PhD in management science. His academic career primarily took place at Mines ParisTech and the Paris Sciences et Lettres University, where he served as an assistant lecturer between 1974 and 1985, and as a second-class professor from 1984 to 1994. In 1995, he was promoted to first class professor and then, in 2007, to exceptional-class professor (2007). From 1998 to 2010, he was also the deputy director of the Centre for Management Science.

In 1995, he created the design engineering program at Mines ParisTech, which he directed until 2009. In 2009, he co-founded and coordinated the Chair of Design Theory and Methods for Innovation with Benoît Weil. In 2014, he contributed to the creation of the Chair of Enterprise Theory, Forms of Governance, and Collective Creation, directed by Blanche Segrestin and Kevin Levillain.

From 1998 to 2006, Armand Hatchuel was a permanent guest professor at Chalmers University in Gothenburg and at the Stockholm School of Economics, where he participated in the FENIX Program (business and knowledge creation).

== C-K Theory ==
Hatchuel with Benoît Weil invented C-K theory, a design theory that models creative reasoning. Hatchuel also developed a theory of prescribing relationships to explain collective learning processes and the crises they encounter in markets and organizations. He unified his work on rationality and the formation of collectives in his axiomatic theory of collective action. This theory clarified the concept of a "management rule" as an emancipating combination of rationality and responsibility, the history and ancient origins of which the author explored in depth. The theory played a role in the enactment of a French Pacte Law of 2019, specifically in the establishment of the French société à mission (profit-with-purpose corporation) status.

== Bibliography ==
- 1992 : L’expert et le système,(with Benoit Weil) Economica (English translation 1995, Experts in Organizations, de Gruyter)
- 1992: Le travail en puces, with Martial Vivet; Jean-Marc Bidaut; François Danielou; François Ginsbourger; Christine Jaeger
- 2001 : Les nouvelles fondations des sciences de Gestion (with Albert David and Romain Laufer), Vuibert Fnege (2001, 2e édition. 2008) et 3e edition en 2013, Presses des mines.
- 2002 : Les nouvelles raisons du savoir, (with Thierry Gaudin), Colloque de Cerisy, La Tour d'Aigues, Ed. de l'Aube, Coll. "essais".
- 2003 : Le libéralisme, l’innovation et la question des limites (with R. Laufer), L’harmattan.
- 2006 : Gouvernement, organisation et Gestion : l’héritage de Michel Foucault, (with Ken Starkey, Eric Pezet and Olivier Lenay) Presses de l’université Laval.
- 2006 : Les processus d’innovation (with Pascal Le Masson and Benoit weil), Hermés Lavoisier.
- 2007 : Les nouveaux régimes de la conception. Langages, théories, métiers. (with Benoit Weil), Colloque de Cerisy, (Vuibert 2007, 2nd édition, 2014, Editions Hermann)
- 2010 : Strategic management of innovation and Design, (with Pascal Le Masson et Benoit Weil) Cambridge University Press.
- 2012 : Refonder l’entreprise, (with Blanche Segrestin), Seuil, La République des idées.
- 2013 : The new foundations of management science (with Albert David and Romain Laufer), Presses des Mines.
- 2013 : L’activité Marchande sans le marché? (avec Franck Aggeri and Olivier Favereau ), Colloque de Cerisy, Presses des Mines.
- 2014 : Théorie, méthodes et organisation de la Conception, (with Pascal Le Masson and Benoit Weil) Presses des Mines.
- 2018 : Design Theory: Methods and Organization for Innovation, (with Pascal Le Masson and Benoit Weil), Springer.
- 2020: Entreprises, Responsabilités et Civilisations: Vers un nouveau cycle du développement durable with Kevin Levillain; Blanche Segrestin; Stéphane Vernac.

== Awards and honours ==
- Economist of the Year Prize - 1996 (category: Organization and Management)
- Medal of l’École des Arts et Métiers
- Member of the French Academy of Technologies
- Fellow of the international Design society
- Fellow of the Creativity and innovation Management Community.
- Commander of the Ordre des Palmes académiques
- Chevalier of the Legion of Honour
- Member of the Economic, Social, and Environmental Council of Morocco (category: expert).
