= Troubleshooting =

Form of problem solving, often applied to repair failed products or processes

Troubleshooting is a form of problem solving, often applied to repair failed products or processes on a machine or a system. It is a logical, systematic search for the source of a problem in order to solve it and make the product or process operational again. Troubleshooting is needed to identify the symptoms. Determining the most likely cause often involves a process of elimination to systematically rule out potential issues. Finally, troubleshooting requires confirmation that the solution restores the product or process to its working state. A strategy is an organized set of activities expressing a plausible way of achieving a goal. Strategies should not be viewed as algorithms, inflexibly followed to solutions. Problem solvers behave opportunistically, adjusting activities within a strategy and changing strategies and tactics in response to information and ideas.

== Diagnostics ==
In general, troubleshooting is the identification or diagnosis of "trouble" in the management flow of a system caused by a failure of some kind. The problem is initially described as symptoms of malfunction, and troubleshooting is the process of determining and remedying the causes of these symptoms.

A system can be described in terms of its expected, desired or intended behavior (usually, for artificial systems, its purpose). Events or inputs to the system are expected to generate specific results or outputs. (For example, selecting the "print" option from various computer applications is intended to result in a hardcopy emerging from some specific device). Any unexpected or undesirable behavior is a symptom. Troubleshooting is the process of isolating the specific cause or causes of the symptom. Frequently the symptom is a failure of the product or process to produce any results. (Nothing was printed, for example). Corrective action can then be taken to prevent further failures of a similar kind.

The methods of forensic engineering are useful in tracing problems in products or processes, and a wide range of analytical techniques are available to determine the cause or causes of specific failures. Corrective action can then be taken to prevent further failure of a similar kind. Preventive action is possible using failure mode and effects (FMEA) and fault tree analysis (FTA) before full-scale production, and these methods can also be used for failure analysis.

There are two major elements required to enable a troubleshooting diagnosis to take place - à priori domain knowledge and search strategies. These are interdependent, and here is where we can identify fundamentally two different types of problem, with matching approaches to their diagnosis. Rasmussen suggested there is strategy guided by the characteristics of the correct functioning of the device (topographic strategy), and strategy guided by the characteristics of abnormal functioning (symptomatic strategy). The second is really asking "what's wrong?" the first is asking "what's happening?"

A strategy is an organized set of activities expressing a plausible way of achieving a goal. Strategies should not be viewed as algorithms, inflexibly followed to solutions. Problem solvers behave opportunistically, adjusting activities within a strategy and changing strategies and tactics in response to information and ideas.

A symptomatic strategy (also known as case-based reasoning, or shallow reasoning) requires à priori domain knowledge that is gleaned from past experience which established connections between symptoms and causes. This knowledge is referred to as shallow, compiled, evidential, history-based as well as case-based knowledge. This is the strategy most associated with diagnosis by experts. Diagnosis of a problem transpires as a rapid recognition process in which symptoms evoke appropriate situation categories. An expert knows the cause by virtue of having previously encountered similar cases. Case-based reasoning is the most powerful strategy, and that used most commonly. However, the strategy won’t work independently with truly novel problems, or where deeper understanding of whatever is taking place is sought. A topographic strategy falls into the category of deep reasoning. With deep reasoning, in-depth knowledge of a system is used. Topography in this context means a description or an analysis of a structured entity, showing the relations among its elements. Also known as reasoning from first principles, deep reasoning is applied to novel faults when experience-based approaches aren’t viable. The topographic strategy is therefore linked to à priori domain knowledge that is developed from a more a fundamental understanding of a system, possibly using first-principles knowledge. Such knowledge is referred to as deep, causal or model-based knowledge.

Hoc noted that symptomatic approaches may need to be supported by topographic approaches because symptoms can be defined in diverse terms. The converse is also true – shallow reasoning can be used abductively to generate causal hypotheses, and deductively to evaluate those hypotheses, in a topographical search.

== Aspects ==
Usually troubleshooting is applied to something that has suddenly stopped working, since its previously working state forms the expectations about its continued behavior. So the initial focus is often on recent changes to the system or to the environment in which it exists. (For example, a printer that "was working when it was plugged in over there"). However, there is a well known principle that correlation does not imply causality. (For example, the failure of a device shortly after it has been plugged into a different outlet doesn't necessarily mean that the events were related. The failure could have been a matter of coincidence.) Therefore, troubleshooting demands critical thinking rather than magical thinking.

It is useful to consider the common experiences we have with light bulbs. Light bulbs "burn out" more or less at random; eventually the repeated heating and cooling of its filament, and fluctuations in the power supplied to it cause the filament to crack or vaporize. The same principle applies to most other electronic devices and similar principles apply to mechanical devices. Some failures are part of the normal wear-and-tear of components in a system.

The first basic principle in troubleshooting is to be able to reproduce the problem, at wish. Second basic principle in troubleshooting is to reduce the "system" to its simplest form that still show the problem. Third basic principle in troubleshooting is to "know what you are looking for. In other words, to fully understand the way the system is supposed to work, so you can "spot" the error when it happens.

A troubleshooter could check each component in a system one by one, substituting known good components for each potentially suspect one. However, this process of "serial substitution" can be considered degenerate when components are substituted without regard to a hypothesis concerning how their failure could result in the symptoms being diagnosed.

Simple and intermediate systems are characterized by lists or trees of dependencies among their components or subsystems. More complex systems contain cyclical dependencies or interactions (feedback loops). Such systems are less amenable to "bisection" troubleshooting techniques.

Systems may be returned to a known functional state through methods such as a computer reboot. Techniques include a cognitive walkthrough. Comprehensive documentation produced by technical writers provides a theory of operation for a device or system.

A common cause of problems is bad design, for example bad human factors design, where a device could be inserted backward or upside down due to the lack of an appropriate forcing function (behavior-shaping constraint), or a lack of error-tolerant design. This is especially bad if accompanied by habituation, where the user just doesn't notice the incorrect usage, for instance if two parts have different functions but share a common case so that it is not apparent on a casual inspection which part is being used.

Troubleshooting can also take the form of a systematic checklist, troubleshooting procedure, flowchart or table that is made before a problem occurs. Developing troubleshooting procedures in advance allows sufficient thought about the steps to take in troubleshooting and organizing the troubleshooting into the most efficient troubleshooting process. Troubleshooting tables can be computerized to make them more efficient for users.

Some computerized troubleshooting services (such as Primary, later renamed Manesar), immediately show the top 10 solutions with the highest probability of fixing the underlying problem. The technician can either answer additional questions to advance through the troubleshooting procedure, each step narrowing the list of solutions, or immediately implement the solution he feels will fix the problem. These services give a rebate if the technician takes an additional step after the problem is solved: report back the solution that actually fixed the problem. The computer uses these reports to update its estimates of which solutions have the highest probability of fixing that particular set of symptoms.

== Half-splitting ==
Efficient methodical troubleshooting starts on with a clear understanding of the expected behavior of the system and the symptoms being observed. From there the troubleshooter forms hypotheses on potential causes, and devises (or perhaps references a standardized checklist of) tests to eliminate these prospective causes. This approach is often called "divide and conquer".

Two common strategies used by troubleshooters are to check for frequently encountered or easily tested conditions first (for example, checking to ensure that a printer's light is on and that its cable is firmly seated at both ends). This is often referred to as "milking the front panel."

Then, "bisect" the system (for example in a network printing system, checking to see if the job reached the server to determine whether a problem exists in the subsystems "towards" the user's end or "towards" the device).

This latter technique can be particularly efficient in systems with long chains of serialized dependencies or interactions among its components. It is simply the application of a binary search across the range of dependencies and is often referred to as "half-splitting". It is similar to the game of "twenty questions": Anyone can isolate one option out of a million by dividing the set of alternatives in half 20 times (because 2^10 = 1024 and 2^20 = 1,048,576).

== Reproducing symptoms ==
In troubleshooting, reproducible problems can be isolated and resolved. Reproducibility involves identifying procedures that induce the reported symptoms.

== Intermittent symptoms ==
Some of the most difficult troubleshooting issues relate to symptoms which occur intermittently. In electronics this often is the result of components that are thermally sensitive (since resistance of a circuit varies with the temperature of the conductors in it). Compressed air can be used to cool specific spots on a circuit board and a heat gun can be used to raise the temperatures; thus troubleshooting of electronics systems frequently entails applying these tools in order to reproduce a problem.

In computer programming race conditions often lead to intermittent symptoms which are extremely difficult to reproduce; various techniques can be used to force the particular function or module to be called more rapidly than it would be in normal operation (analogous to "heating up" a component in a hardware circuit) while other techniques can be used to introduce greater delays in, or force synchronization among, other modules or interacting processes.

Intermittent issues can be thus defined:

An intermittent is a problem for which there is no known procedure to consistently reproduce its symptom.

— Steven Litt,

In particular he asserts that there is a distinction between the frequency of occurrence and a "known procedure to consistently reproduce" an issue. For example, knowing that an intermittent problem occurs " within" an hour of a particular stimulus or event ... but that sometimes it happens in five minutes and other times it takes almost an hour ... does not constitute a "known procedure" even if the stimulus does increase the frequency of observable exhibitions of the symptom.

Nevertheless, sometimes troubleshooters must resort to statistical methods ... and can only find procedures to increase the symptom's occurrence to a point at which serial substitution or some other technique is feasible. In such cases, even when the symptom seems to disappear for significantly longer periods, there is a low confidence that the root cause has been found and that the problem is truly solved.

Also, tests may be run to stress certain components to determine if those components have failed.

== Multiple problems ==
Isolating single component failures that cause reproducible symptoms is relatively straightforward.

However, many problems only occur as a result of multiple failures or errors. This is particularly true of fault tolerant systems, or those with built-in redundancy. Features that add redundancy, fault detection and failover to a system may also be subject to failure, and enough different component failures in any system will "take it down."

Even in simple systems, the troubleshooter must always consider the possibility that there is more than one fault. (Replacing each component, using serial substitution, and then swapping each new component back out for the old one when the symptom is found to persist, can fail to resolve such cases. More importantly, the replacement of any component with a defective one can actually increase the number of problems rather than eliminating them).

Note that, while we talk about "replacing components" the resolution of many problems involves adjustments or tuning rather than "replacement." For example, intermittent breaks in conductors --- or "dirty or loose contacts" might simply need to be cleaned and/or tightened. All discussion of "replacement" should be taken to mean "replacement or adjustment or other modification."

== See also ==
- Five whys
- Bathtub curve
- Cause and effect
- Debugging
- Forensic engineering
- No fault found
- Problem solving
- Root-cause analysis
- Rapid problem resolution diagnosis
