= Nine windows =

The nine windows technique, also known as 9 windows, 9 boxes, 9 screens, multiscreen diagram, or system operator tool is a creative problem-solving technique that analyzes a problem across time and relative to its place within a system.

The approach is based on the Theory of Inventive Problem Solving (TRIZ) and involves creating a 3 × 3 matrix and placing the current problem in the center.

Nine-windows matrix
	Past	Present	Future
Super-system			
System		Current issue	
Sub-system			

The 3 × 3 matrix is divided into three problem-solving levels:

- Super-system, also known as the macro system, refers to the external components and environment that currently interact with the problem or system.
- System refers to the problem or system itself.
- Sub-system, also known as the micro system, refers to the parts or components of the problem or system.

== See also ==
- Business model canvas, business model template with nine boxes
