= Yoram Reich =

Israeli engineering professor (born 1958)

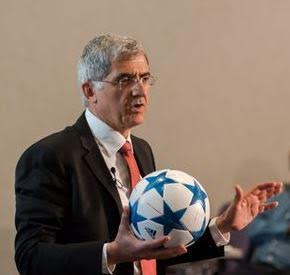
Prof. Yoram Reich

Yoram Reich (Hebrew: יורם רייך; born 1958) is an Israeli Chaired Professor in Engineering Design and Systems Engineering at the School of Mechanical Engineering, Faculty of Engineering at Tel Aviv University. Fellow of the Design Society, Fellow of the Design Research Society, and an Honorary Fellow of the Israeli chapter of INCOSE, INCOSE-IL. He contributed to engineering design, systems engineering, biomimicry, and sustainability.

== Early life and education ==
Yoram Reich was born in Tel Aviv-Yafo. While in high school, he took computer science and mathematics courses at Bar-Ilan University. In 1980 he graduated with a BSc degree in mechanical engineering from Tel Aviv University. He continued his master's degree in the same department and graduated in 1984. In 1991, he completed a PhD at Carnegie Mellon University in civil engineering with a thesis titled "Building and Improving Design Systems: A Machine Learning Approach."

== Career ==
Reich received the rank of full professor at Tel Aviv University in 2007. In 2011, he founded the Israel Institute for Empowerment of Innovation with partners from academia and industry and served as president and chairman of the institute's board of directors. In 2017, he founded with other partners the Systems Engineering Research Initiative at Tel Aviv University, and in 2019, he founded with these partners the Master's Degree Program with a Thesis in Systems Engineering. He has headed both initiatives since their founding.

In 1979 and 1980, Reich worked as a research assistant at Tel Aviv University. In 1980, he began serving in the IDF as an engineer in the Navy, and in 1985, he founded a new section for research and development and computer-aided design, which he headed until 1986. From 1986 to 1991, he was a research assistant at the Research Center for Design Engineering at Carnegie Mellon University in Pittsburgh and became a visiting research fellow in 1991 to 1993 and in the summers of 1996 and 1997. In 1993, Reich was appointed as a senior lecturer in the School of Mechanical Engineering in the Faculty of Engineering at Tel Aviv University. From 1996 to 2000, he served as a board member of the Israeli branch of the International Organization of Manufacturing Engineers (SME Chapter 319), and from 1998 to 1999, he served as the branch's chairman. From 2009 to 2021, he served as a member of the advisory board of the Design Society. He founded and served as co-chair of the Society's Design Theory Interest Group from 2008 to 2014. Since 2010, Reich has served as editor-in-chief of the international journal Research in Engineering Design.

== Memberships in professional organizations ==
- Member of the International Council on Systems Engineering (INCOSE).
- Honorary Fellow of INCOSE-IL
- Fellow of the Design Research Society
- Fellow of The Design Society

== Research ==
Reich was a pioneer in the use of machine learning (ML) in engineering, starting from his early publications in 1989 and his doctoral work on the use of ML methods to design bridges. He contributed to the foundation of collaborative design and design theory through numerous publications, including co-developing several design theories: couple design process (with Professor Dan Braha), infused design (with Prof. Offer Shai), and Problem-Social-Institutional framework and theory of design (with Prof. Eswaran Subrahmanian from Carnegie Mellon University).

== Selected works ==
=== Books ===
- Arie Karniel and Yoram Reich, Managing the Dynamics of New Product Development Processes: A New Product Lifecycle Management Paradigm, Springer, 2011.
- Helfman Cohen Yael and Reich Yoram, Biomimetic Design Method for Innovation and Sustainability, Springer, 2016.
- Eswaran Subrahmanian, Yoram Reich, Sruthi Krishnan, We Are Not Users: Dialogues, Diversity, and Design, MIT Press, 2020.
- Nevo, M., Reich, Y., Mishori, D., Levin, L., (editors), Leshomra, Sustainable and Ecological Communities in Israel, Resling, Tel Aviv, 2023, In Hebrew.

=== Selected papers ===
- Y. Reich and S. J. Fenves, The potential of machine learning techniques for expert systems, Artificial Intelligence for Engineering Design, Analysis, and Manufacturing, 3(3):175-193, 1989.
- Y. Reich, Design knowledge acquisition: Task analysis and a partial implementation, Knowledge Acquisition, 3(3):237-254, 1991.
- Y. Reich and S. J. Fenves, Inductive learning of synthesis knowledge, International Journal of Expert Systems: Research and Applications, 5(4):275-297, 1992.
- Y. Reich, A model of aesthetic judgment in design, Artificial Intelligence in Engineering, 8(2):141-153, 1993.
- D. Fisher, X. Ling, R. Carnes, Y. Reich, S. Fenves, J. Chen, R. Shiavi, G. Biswas, and J. Weinberg, Selected applications of an AI clustering technique to engineering tasks, IEEE Expert, 8(6):51-60, 1993.
- Y. Reich, The development of Bridger: A methodological study of research on the use of machine learning in design, Artificial Intelligence in Engineering, 8(3):217-231, 1993.
- Y. Reich, S. Konda, S. N. Levy, I. Monarch, and E. Subrahmanian, New roles for machine learning in design, Artificial Intelligence in Engineering, 8(3):165-181, 1993.
- Y. Reich and S. J. Fenves, A system that learns to design cable-stayed bridges, Journal of Structural Engineering, ASCE, 121(7):1090-1100, 1995.
- Y. Reich and S. V. Barai, Evaluating machine learning models for engineering problems, Artificial Intelligence in Engineering, 13(3):257-272, 1999.
- Y. Reich, A critical review of General Design Theory, Research in Engineering Design, 7(1):1-18, 1995.
- Y. Reich and S. J. Fenves, "The formation and use of abstract concepts in design," in Concept Formation: Knowledge and Experience in Unsupervised Learning (D. H. J. Fisher, M. J. Pazzani, and P. Langley, eds.), (Los Altos, CA), pp. 323–353, Morgan Kaufmann, 1991.
- D. Braha and Y. Reich, "Topological structures for modeling engineering design processes," in Proceedings of ICED 2001, (London), Institution of Mechanical Engineers, 2001.
- Y. Sered and Y. Reich, Standardization and modularization driven by minimizing overall process effort, Computer-Aided Design, 38(5):405-416, 2006.
- Y. Reich, Measuring the value of knowledge, International Journal of Human-Computer Studies, 42(1):3-30, 1995.
- Y. Reich, Layered models of research methodologies, Artificial Intelligence for Engineering Design, Analysis, and Manufacturing, 8(4):263-274, 1994.
- Shaked, A., & Reich, Y. (2019). Designing development processes related to system of systems using a modeling framework. Systems Engineering, 22(6), 561-575.
- Reich, Y., & Subrahmanian, E. (2020). The PSI framework and theory of design. IEEE transactions on engineering management, 69(4), 1037-1049.
- Shaked, A., & Reich, Y. (2020). Improving process descriptions in research by model-based analysis. IEEE Systems Journal, 15(1), 435-444.
- Shaked, A., & Reich, Y. (2021). Using domain-specific models to facilitate model-based systems-engineering: Development process design modeling with OPM and PROVE. Applied Sciences, 11(4), 1532.
- Shaked, A., & Reich, Y. (2021). Requirements for model-based development process design and compliance of standardized models. Systems, 9(1), 3.
- Engel, A., Teller, A., Shachar, S., & Reich, Y. (2021). Robust design under cumulative damage due to dynamic failure mechanisms. Systems Engineering, 24(5), 322-338.
- Reich, Y., & Subrahmanian, E. (2022). Documenting design research by structured multilevel analysis: supporting the diversity of the design research community of practice. Design Science, 8, e3.
- Lavi, E., & Reich, Y. (2024). Cross-disciplinary system value overview towards value-oriented design. Research in Engineering Design, 35(1), 1-20.
- Lavi, E., & Reich, Y. (2024). Supporting Decision-Making in Value-Oriented Design: A Multi-Domain System Value Model. IEEE Transactions on Engineering Management.
- Reich, Y., & Subrahmanian, E. (2025). Navigating complexity beyond collaborative design: the PSI network model and case studies. Research in Engineering Design, 36(2), 4.
- Efrati, S., & Reich, Y. (2025). System flow centrality index for evaluating the influence of a given system element in a network graph. Expert Systems with Applications, 126869.
- Reich, Y., & Subrahmanian, E. (2025). Navigating complexity beyond collaborative design: the PSI network model and case studies. Research in Engineering Design, 36(2), 4.

== Awards ==
- Tel Aviv University Rector's Award, 1978.
- Tel Aviv University Rector's Award, 1979.
- Fulbright Doctoral Fellowship, 1986.
- Rothschild Doctoral Fellowship, 1986.
- Carnegie Mellon University Research Fellowship, Pittsburgh, USA, 1987-1991.
- Outstanding Paper at ICED'09 (highest reviewers ranking among 379 papers), 2009.
- ICED'11 Reviewer's Award (highest reviewers ranking among 416 papers), 2011.
- Fellow of the International Design Research Society, 2014.
- Best paper Award of the Journal Systems Engineering, 2019.
- Journal outstanding paper of 2021 of the journal Systems Engineering, 2021.
- Honorary Fellow of the Israeli chapter of INCOSE, INCOSE-IL.
- Fellow of the International Design Society, 2023.
- Chair in Engineering Design and Systems Engineering, 2023.
