= No fault found =

Term used in technical maintenance

No fault found (NFF), no trouble found (NTF) or no defect found (NDF) are terms used in the field of maintenance, where a unit is removed from service following a complaint of a perceived fault by operators or an alarm from its BIT (built-in test) equipment. The unit is then checked, but no anomaly is detected by the maintainer. Consequently, the unit is returned to service with no repair performed.

If there is an underlying fault that has not been detected the unit may be returned for repair several times with no fault identified. Alternative descriptors include:

- No fault found (NFF)
- Cannot duplicate (CND)
- Fault not found (FNF)
- No trouble found (NTF)
- No defect found (NDF)
- Hidden failures
- False failures

== The NFF problem ==
Depiction of the no fault found cycle. Each clockwise cycle after the initial is a waste of maintenance resource.

As the figure shows once a fault has been reported, investigated, and no fault found any future problems caused by the fault cause additional work which is a waste of maintainer time. Different causes have been suggested for this issue.

- Some can be attributed to the way a possible fault is perceived by the user.
- Some can be attributed to the diagnostic methods available to the maintainer.

The fact remains that no fault found causes a cost to industry. NFF is thought to cost the United States Department of Defense in excess of US$2 billion per year.

== See also ==
- Troubleshooting
- Unintended consequences
