= C-K theory =

Design theory

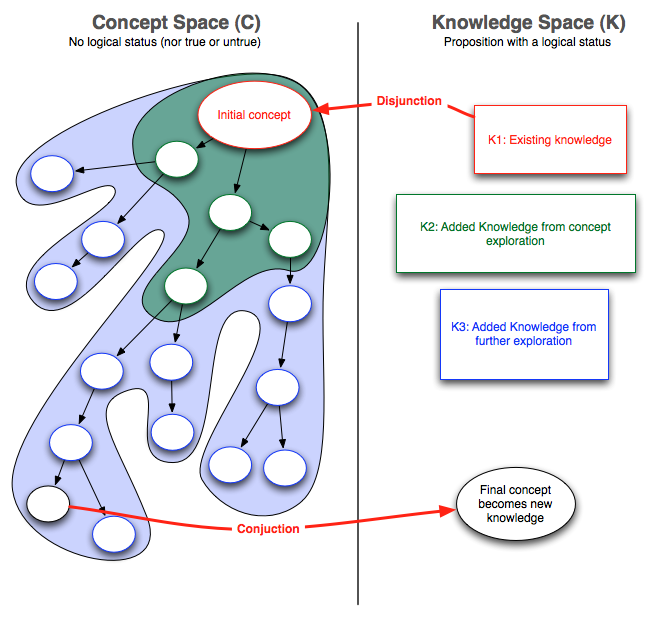
A graphical representation of a Design Process using C-K Design Theory.

C-K design theory or concept-knowledge theory is both a design theory and a theory of reasoning in design. It defines design reasoning as a logic of expansion processes, i.e. a logic that organizes the generation of unknown objects. The theory builds on several traditions of design theory, including systematic design, axiomatic design, creativity theories, general and formal design theories.

== Background ==
Claims made for C-K design theory include that it is the first design theory that:

1. Offers a comprehensive formalization of design that is independent of any design domain or object
2. Explains invention, creation, and discovery within the same framework as design processes.

The name of the theory is based on its central premises: the distinction between two spaces:

- a space of concepts C
- a space of knowledge K.

The process of design is defined as a double expansion of the C and K spaces through the application of four types of operators: C→C, C→K, K→C, K→K.

The first draft of C-K theory was sketched by Armand Hatchuel, and then developed by Hatchuel and his colleague, Benoît Weil. Recent publications explain C-K theory and its practical application in different industries.

== Genesis of C-K theory ==
C-K theory was a response to three perceived limitations of existing design theories:

1. Design theory when assimilated to problem solving theory is unable to account for innovative aspects of design.
2. Classic design theories dependent on object domains, machine design, architecture or industrial design favored design theories that were tailored to their specific knowledge bases and contexts. Without a unified design theory these fields experience difficulties over cooperation in real design situations.
3. Design theories and creativity theories have been developed as separate fields of research. But design theory should include the creative, surprising and serendipitous aspects of design; while creativity theories have been unable to account for intentional inventive processes common in design fields.

C-K theory uses an approach which is domain-independent and which allows acting on unknown objects, and changes of the definitions of known objects during the process (revision of objects' identities). C-K theory was shown by Hatchuel and Weil to be closely related to Braha's Formal Design Theory and its clarification by Braha and Reich's Coupled Design Theory, which are both based on topological structures for design modeling.

== Structure of C-K theory ==
The core idea behind C-K theory is to define rigorously a design situation. A brief is an incomplete description of objects that do not exist yet and are still partly unknown. The first step in C-K theory is to define a brief as a concept, through the introduction of a formal distinction between concept and knowledge spaces; the second step is to characterize the operators that are needed between these two spaces.

=== Knowledge ===
The knowledge space is defined as a set of propositions with a logical status, according to the knowledge available to the designer or the group of designers. The knowledge space (i.e. K-Space) describes all objects and truths that are established from the point of view of the designer. Then K-Space is expandable as new truths may appear in it as an effect of the design process. Conversely, the structure and properties of the K-Space have a major influence on the process.

=== Concept ===
A concept is defined as a proposition without a logical status in the K-Space. A central finding of C-K theory is that concepts are the necessary departure point of a design process. Without concepts, design reduces to standard optimization or problem-solving. Concepts assert the existence of an unknown object that presents some properties desired by the designer. Concepts can be partitioned or included, but not searched nor explored.

=== C-K operators ===
Building on these premises, C-K theory shows the design process as the result of four operators: C→K, K→C, C→C, K→K.

- The initial concept is partitioned using propositions from K: K→C
- These partitions add new properties to the concepts and create new concepts: C→C
- Thanks to a conjunction C→K this expansion of C may in return provoke the expansion of the K space: K→K

The process can be synthesized through a design square. One design solution for a first concept C0 will be a path in the C-space that forms a new proposition in K. There may exist several design paths for the same C0.

The C-K Design Square

== Central findings ==
The following graphical representation summarises the design process using C-K theory.

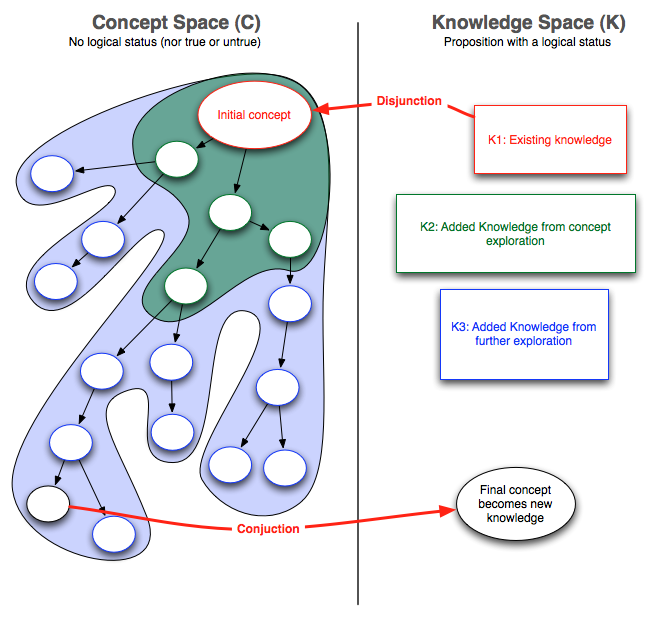

Crazy concepts

Crazy concepts are concepts that seem absurd as an exploration path in a design process. Both C-K theory and practical applications have shown that crazy concepts can benefit the global design process by adding extra knowledge, not to be used to pursue that "crazy concept" design path, but to be used to further define a more "sensible concept" and lead to its eventual conjunction. The following image is a graphical representation of this process.

Design creativity

The creative aspect of Design results from two distinct expansions: C-expansions which may be seen as "new ideas", and K-expansions which are necessary to validate these ideas or to expand them towards successful designs.

Unification of design theories

Domain dependent design theories are built on some specific structure of the K-space, either by assuming that some objects have invariant definitions and properties (like in all engineering fields), or by assuming that the K-space presents some stable structure (e.g. that the functions of an object can be defined independently from its technical realization, as in systematic design theory).

Theory of design

At The Design Society's 2009 International Conference on Engineering Design, an awarded-paper links scientific discovery and design process using C-K theory as a formal framework. It is suggested that a science of design is possible, and complementary to the more traditional bounded rationality.

Mathematical modelling

Mathematical approaches to design have been developed since the 1960s by scholars such as Christopher Alexander, Hiroyuki Yoshikawa, Dan Braha and Yoram Reich. They tended to model the dynamic co-evolution between design solutions and requirements. Within the field of engineering design, C-K theory opens new modelling directions that explore connections with basic issues in logic and mathematics; these are different from the classic use of scientific models in design. It has been argued that C-K theory has analogies with forcing in set theory, and with intuitionistic mathematics.

Industrial applications

C-K theory has been applied in several industrial contexts since 1998, mainly in France, Sweden and Germany. It is generally used as a method that increases the innovative capacity of design and R&D departments. C-K theory has also inspired new management principles for collaborative innovation, with the aim of overcoming the limitations of standard design management methods.
