= Dimension time cost model =

Problem-solving technique

The dimension time cost model (DTC) is a creative problem-solving technique that analyzes a problem by maximizing its possible characteristics. Dimension can also encompass other physical characteristics such as temperature, brightness, mass, etc. The DTC model encouragaes creativity by reviewing a system at its potential minimal and maximal points.

The approach is based on the theory of inventive problem solving (TRIZ).

DTC model
Limits		Real value	How does the solution look?	Possible solution principle
D	0			
D	∞			
T	0			
T	∞			
C	0			
C	∞			
