= Grey problem =

Concept in information technology

In IT, a grey problem (or, gray problem) is a problem where the causing technology is unknown or unconfirmed. Common grey problems are:

- Intermittent errors;
- Intermittent incorrect output, or;
- Transient performance problems.

Because the causing technology is not clear, IT departments often find it difficult to allocate the problem to a Technical Support Team (platform team).

== Background ==
Combining frequency and causing technology information can provide a view of the complexity of a problem and so indicate how difficult it will be to investigate.

The problems in each quadrant have certain characteristics:

Quadrant 1
In a typical IT department 80 to 90% of problems are solid faults that are easily tracked down to a causing technology. The appropriate technical or platform support team efficiently deals with these problems every day.

Quadrant 2
Some recurring problems are due to a Known Error, or are obviously being caused by a particular hardware or software component. These problems are handled by technical support people working with suppliers.

Quadrant 3
Every so often a one-off problem occurs, and the cause of these may never be found.

Quadrant 4
The technical ownership of these issues is unclear and so they are referred to as “grey problems” i.e. not black and white.

== Impact ==
Grey problems have a significant impact on IT service, and:

- Form the bulk of ongoing recurring problems
- Create a disproportionately high IT support workload
- Give a pointer to more serious problems to come
- Cause the business to adjust practices around the problem

== ITIL perspective ==
ITIL Service Operations implies that grey problems should be handled through a Problem Solving Group under the direction of the Problem Management function. In practice, even those IT organisations that have adopted ITIL rarely have a procedure to handle a grey problem, leaving it to bounce between Technical Support Teams as each denies that their technology is to blame.

== See also ==
- ITIL, framework with best practices for administering IT services and assets
  - ITIL v3 Problem Management
  - ITIL v3 Incident Management,
- COBIT, a business-focused framework for information technology
- Rapid problem resolution diagnosis (RPR), problem diagnosis method designed to determine the root cause of IT problems
