= TRIZ =

Problem-solving tools

TRIZ (/trɪz/; Russian: теория решения изобретательских задач, romanized: teoriya resheniya izobretatelskikh zadach, lit. 'theory of inventive problem solving') is a methodology which combines an organized, systematic method of problem-solving with analysis and forecasting techniques derived from the study of patterns of invention in global patent literature. The development and improvement of products and technologies in accordance with TRIZ are guided by the laws of technical systems evolution. In English, TRIZ is typically rendered as the theory of inventive problem solving.

The development of TRIZ, led by Soviet inventor and science-fiction author Genrich Altshuller and his colleagues, began in 1946. TRIZ developed from a foundation of research into hundreds of thousands of inventions in many fields to produce an approach which defines patterns in inventive solutions and the characteristics of the problems which these inventions have overcome. The research produced three findings:

- Problems and solutions are repeated across industries and sciences.
- Patterns of technical evolution are replicated in industries and sciences.
- The innovations have scientific effects outside the field in which they were developed.

TRIZ applies these findings to create and improve products, services, and systems.

== History ==
TRIZ was developed by the Soviet inventor and science-fiction writer Genrich Altshuller and his associates. Altshuller began developing TRIZ in 1946 while working in the inventions inspection department of the Caspian Sea flotilla of the Soviet Navy. His role involved evaluating invention proposals, refining and documenting them, and preparing patent applications. Through this work, Altshuller recognised that many technical problems require inventive solutions because improving one parameter often leads to the deterioration of another, a situation he termed a technical contradiction.

Altshuller's work on what later became TRIZ was interrupted in 1950 by his arrest and a 25-year sentence to the Vorkuta Gulag. The arrest was partially triggered by letters that he and Refael Shapiro sent to Stalin, government ministers, and newspapers, criticising Soviet policy decisions they considered erroneous. Altshuller and Shapiro were released during the Khrushchev Thaw following Stalin’s death in 1953, and subsequently returned to Baku.

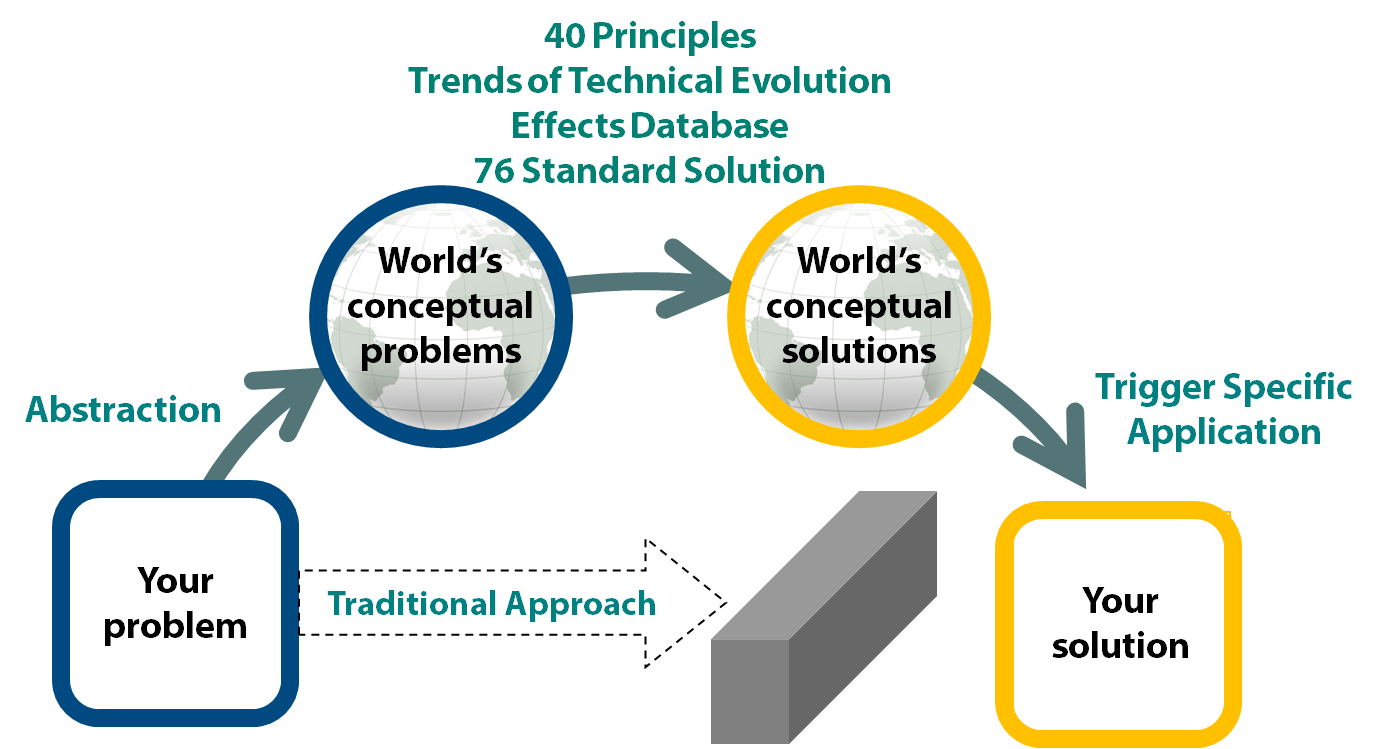
TRIZ flowchart

The first academic paper on TRIZ, On the psychology of inventive creation, was published in 1956 in the journal Issues in Psychology.

By observing skilled inventors at work, Altshuller identified recurring patterns of creative thinking, which he used to develop a set of problem-solving tools and techniques. These included Smart Little People and Thinking in Time and Scale (also known as the Screens of Talented Thought).

In 1986, Altshuller shifted his focus from technical problem-solving to the development of individual creativity. He adapted TRIZ for use by children, and this version was tested in several schools. Following the end of the Cold War, emigrants from the former Soviet Union contributed to the international dissemination of TRIZ.

== Basic principles ==
The TRIZ method 40 principles of invention rendered schematically, stacked vertically in four-column, within single A3 paper sheet

TRIZ claims that by studying an individual parameter that is causing a problem (e.g., the mass of an object needs to be reduced), and the other parameters with which it conflicts (e.g., the lower mass would require thinner material, which is more likely to undergo catastrophic failure), solutions can be created. This is actually the simplification of some fact. Namely, the structured contents of each of the cells within the contradiction matrix, (i.e. cells fulfilled with ordered principles and identified by their order numbers) - the principles of inventions have been chosen, due to realized necessary statistical extensive studies.

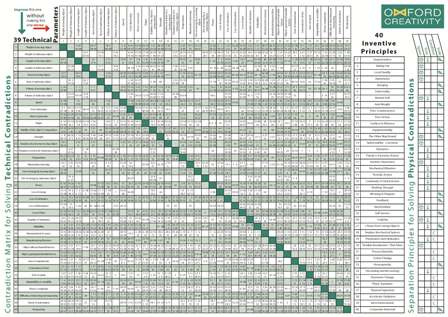
Contradiction matrix

The 40 principles of invention are a suite of ideas that purport to aid in solving hard technical problems. The principles are based on TRIZ. One tool which evolved as an extension of TRIZ is a contradiction matrix, a structured and systematic representation of basic engineering parameters of objects, or systems, such as mass, length and manufacturing tolerances. The ideal final result (IFR) is the ultimate solution of a problem when the desired result is achieved by itself. Studies led by Altshuller led to this approach: according to Altshuller, every technical problem that requires a solution can be categorized in terms of what he called its main technical contradiction.

Altshuller proposed that the process of evolution of any given system is ruled by general laws of systems evolution. One such law says that the process of finding the solution can be facilitated by forming analogies to solutions that had already been found for another technical problem. However, the main point is to acquire the necessary experience in correctly defining the Main Technical Contradiction.

Altshuller screened patents to discover which contradictions were resolved or eliminated by each invention and how this had been achieved. After identifying a distinction between incremental or "routine" inventions and those which represented true breakthrough inventions, he developed a set of 40 inventive principles and, later, a matrix of contradictions. Although TRIZ was developed from analyzing technical systems, it has been used to understand and solve management problems.

== Use in industry ==
Samsung has invested in embedding TRIZ throughout the company.

BAE Systems and GE also use TRIZ, Mars has documented how TRIZ led to a new patent for chocolate packaging. It has been used by Leafield Engineering, Smart Stabilizer Systems, and Buro Happold to solve problems and generate new patents.

The automakers Rolls-Royce, Ford, and Daimler-Chrysler, Johnson & Johnson, aeronautics companies Boeing, NASA, technology companies Hewlett-Packard, Motorola, General Electric, Xerox, IBM, LG, Intel, Procter & Gamble, Expedia, and Kodak have also used TRIZ methods in projects.

The industrial case study done at Intel scientifically validated the use and application of TRIZ in the semiconductor and high-tech industries, which was measured to provide significant productivity and profitability gain for the company, officially verified by Intel's Finance to exceed $212.5M in Return on Investment over the course of a 21-month deployment of the methodology across Intel's semiconductor manufacturing eco-system.

TOP-TRIZ is a version of developed and integrated TRIZ methods promoted by TRIZ Master Zinovy Royzen, it is his version of TRIZ; it is not accepted as the definitive modern method of TRIZ by the International TRIZ Association (MATRIZ) "TOP-TRIZ includes further development of problem formulation and problem modeling, development of Standard Solutions into Standard Techniques, further development of ARIZ and Technology Forecasting. TOP-TRIZ has integrated its methods into a universal and user-friendly system for innovation." In 1992, several TRIZ practitioners fleeing the collapsing Soviet Union relocated and formed Ideation International. They developed I-TRIZ, their version of TRIZ.

In Liberating Structures, the facilitation method, also called TRIZ, was "inspired by one small element of" the original TRIZ methodology but is used in a distinct context. The method helps groups to identify and eliminate counterproductive practices by imagining the worst possible outcomes, recognizing current actions contributing to these scenarios, and designing practical steps to prevent them. This participatory approach emphasizes collaborative problem-solving within teams, setting it apart from the engineering-focused origins of the original TRIZ framework.

Within Spanish-language educational literature, educator Saturnino de la Torre described Diálogo Analógico Creativo (Analogical Creative Dialogue, DAC) as a structured classroom procedure that sequences analogy generation, perspective shifting and guided evaluation to convert initial intuitions into applicable proposals in group settings. Although framed for higher education rather than engineering, this approach has been discussed alongside inventive problem-solving frameworks and classroom adaptations that orchestrate divergent and convergent phases in ways comparable to TRIZ-inspired practice.

The German-based nonprofit European TRIZ Association, founded in 2000, hosts conferences with publications.

== See also ==
- Brainstorming – Group creativity technique
- Dimension time cost model – Problem-solving technique
- C-K theory – Design theory
- Lateral thinking – Manner of solving problems
- Laws of technical systems evolution – Outlining trends of technical evolution
- Morphological analysis (problem-solving) – Exploration of possible solutions
- Nine windows
- Systems theory – Interdisciplinary study of systems
- Trial and error – Method of problem-solving
- Systematic inventive thinking – Academic method for creative thinking
- Unified structured inventive thinking
- SCAMPER – Acronym for the creative development process proposed by Alex Faickney Osborn
