= SCAMPER =

Acronym for the creative development process proposed by Alex Faickney Osborn

SCAMPER ("substitute, combine, adjust, modify, put to other uses, eliminate, reverse") is an acronym that provides a structured way of assisting students to think out of the box and enhance their knowledge.

It is thought to protect students' creativity as they mature.

== History ==
The SCAMPER technique was developed by Bob Eberle, who was looking for a way to foster creativity in children. Eberle was inspired by the checklist described by Alex Faickney Osborn in his book Applied Imagination. SCAMPER was also influenced by techniques created by Frank E. Williams and his colleagues to encourage creative-imaginative expression in children. Eberle used some of Osborn's questions, along with insights from the work of Williams and his team, to create the SCAMPER technique, which he described in his 1971 book "SCAMPER: Games for Imagination Development."

== Definition ==
SCAMPER is an activity-based thinking process that can be performed by cooperative learning. Here the teacher assists the students in choosing a particular topic and helps them to develop it through a structured process. After picking an idea, the students are given a tale where they perform the activity in steps corresponding to the letters in the name.

- Substitute (analogy) comes up with another topic that is equivalent to the present topics.
- Combine (convergence) adds information to the original topic.
- Adjust identifies ways to construct the topic in a more flexible and adjusted material.
- Modify, magnify, minify creatively changes the topic or makes a feature/idea bigger or smaller.
- Put to other uses (generate/divergence/connect) identifies the possible scenarios and situations where this topic can be used.
- Eliminate removes ideas or elements from the topic that are not valuable.
- Reverse, rearrange evolves a new concept from the original concept.

Hence, SCAMPER as a teaching strategy helps the students to analyze the knowledge in its creative form and helps the teacher to make teaching creative and interesting.

We can link creativity methods to Combinatorics.
