= Genrikh Altshuller =

Soviet engineer and inventor

Genrikh Saulovich Altshuller
- Born: 15 October 1926; Tashkent, Uzbek SSR, USSR
- Died: 24 September 1998 (aged 71); Petrozavodsk, Russia
- Website: altshuller.ru

Genrikh Saulovich Altshuller (Russian: Ге́нрих Сау́лович Альтшу́ллер, pronounced [ˈɡʲɛnrʲɪx sɐˈuləvʲɪtɕ əlʲtʂulʲɪr]; 15 October 1926 – 24 September 1998) was a Soviet engineer, inventor, and writer. He is most notable for creating the Theory of Inventive Problem Solving, better known by its Russian acronym TRIZ. He founded the Azerbaijan Public Institute for Inventive Creation and was the first president of the TRIZ Association. He also wrote science fiction under the pen name Genrikh Altov.

== Early life ==
Altshuller was born in Tashkent, Uzbekistan (formerly the USSR) to a family of journalists of Jewish background. He moved with his family to Baku, Azerbaijan, where he spent most of his life. After graduating from high school he was admitted to the Azerbaijan Industrial Institute. Altshuller enlisted in the Army in 1944 and was trained as a fighter pilot but did not see action.

He joined the Soviet Navy at the age of twenty and attracted attention for his ability to fix engines, getting assigned to the Commission of Innovation of the Caspian Navy Flotilla.

Working as a clerk in a patent office, Altshuller embarked on finding some generic rules that would explain the creation of new, inventive, patentable ideas. He eventually created the Teoriya Resheniya Izobreatatelskikh Zadach (Theory of Inventive Problem Solving or TRIZ)). In 1956 he wrote a paper with his school friend Rafael Shapiro, Psychology of inventive creativity, which was to become influential in the study of invention development.

== Arrest and imprisonment ==
During Joseph Stalin's political purges of members of the Communist Party in 1950, he and Shapiro were imprisoned for political reasons, after sending a letter to Stalin, and he continued his studies with his fellow inmates while in the Vorkuta labor camp. After his release in 1954, Altshuller settled in Baku, Azerbaijan.

== The spread of TRIZ in the Soviet Union ==
A full-fledged TRIZ movement developed among Soviet engineers and other technically inclined people by the 1970s, and Altshuller played the role of its intellectual leader. He lectured at TRIZ congresses, published articles and books and corresponded with various TRIZ practitioners. He became the founding member and president of the Russian TRIZ Association. A number of his close friends and students have become the most prominent thinkers and teachers of the movement, popularizing TRIZ in Russia and abroad. In 1971 he founded the Azerbaijan Public Institute of Inventive Creativity, a school that was "a blend of bohemian improvisation and gearhead thinking".

For a long time he published articles on TRIZ, with examples and exercises, in the Soviet popular science magazine Izobretatel i Ratsionalizator (Inventor and Innovator).

== After the Soviet collapse ==
Altshuller left Baku in the early 1990s amidst post-Soviet-breakup violence in the area. He settled in Petrozavodsk (Karelia in north-western Russia) with his wife and granddaughter. As a result, Petrozavodsk became the center of the TRIZ Association.

He died from complications of Parkinson's disease in 1998.

== Science fiction ==
Following his release from prison camp in the 1950s, he earned a living as a science fiction writer, under the pseudonym Genrikh Altov (Генрих Альтов), often in collaboration with his wife, Valentina Zhuravleva, whom he married in 1957.

=== Science fiction published as Genrich Altov ===
- Икар и Дедал 1958 (Icarus and Daedalus)
- Легенды о звездных капитанах 1961 (Legends of Starship Captains)
- Опаляющий разум 1968 (Scorching Mind)
- Создан для бури 1970 (Made for the Storm)
- Летящие по Вселенной 2002, with Valentina Zhuravleva (They Who Fly Through Space)
