= Creativity =

Forming something new and somehow valuable

A picture of an incandescent light bulb, a symbol associated with the formation of an idea, an example of creativity

Creativity is the ability to generate novel and valuable ideas or works through the exercise of imagination. The products of creativity may be classified as either intangible or physical. Intangible products of creativity include ideas, scientific theories, literary works, musical compositions, and jokes. Physical products of creativity include inventions, dishes or meals, pieces of jewelry, costumes, and paintings.

Creativity may also describe the ability to find new solutions to problems or new methods to accomplish a goal. Therefore, creativity enables people to solve problems in new ways.

Most ancient cultures (including ancient Greece, ancient China, and ancient India) lacked the concept of creativity, seeing art as a form of discovery rather than a form of creation. In the Judeo-Christian-Islamic tradition, creativity is seen as the sole province of God, and human creativity was considered an expression of God's work; the modern conception of creativity came about during the Renaissance, influenced by humanist ideas.

Scholarly interest in creativity is found in several disciplines, primarily psychology, business studies, and cognitive science. It is also present in education and the humanities (including philosophy and the arts).

== Etymology ==
The English word "creativity" comes from the Latin term creare (meaning "to create"). Its derivational suffixes also come from Latin, such as the etymological root “crescere”, which means “to let things grow”. This aspect of creativity is emphasized more in indigenous and Eastern concepts of creativity. The word "create" appeared in English as early as the 14th century—notably in Chaucer's The Parson's Tale to indicate divine creation. The modern meaning of creativity in reference to human creation did not emerge until after the Age of Enlightenment.

== Definition ==
In a summary of scientific research into creativity, psychology professor Michael Mumford wrote, "We seem to have reached a general agreement that creativity involves the production of novel, useful products." Similarly, in psychologist Robert Sternberg's words, creativity produces "something original and worthwhile".

Authors have diverged dramatically in their precise definitions beyond these general commonalities: social geographer Peter Meusburger estimated that over a hundred different definitions can be found in the literature. One definition given by Dr. E. Paul Torrance in the context of assessing an individual's creative ability is "a process of becoming sensitive to problems, deficiencies, gaps in knowledge, missing elements, disharmonies; identifying the difficulty; searching for solutions, making guesses, or formulating hypotheses about the deficiencies: testing and retesting these hypotheses and possibly modifying and retesting them; and finally communicating the results."

Philosophy professor Ignacio L. Götz, following the etymology of the word, argued that creativity is not necessarily "making". He confined it to the act of creating without thinking about the end product. While many definitions of creativity seem almost synonymous with originality, Götz also emphasized the difference between creativity and originality. Götz asserted that one can be creative without necessarily being original. When someone creates something, they are certainly creative at that point, but they may not be original in the sense that their creation is not something new.

Creativity in general is usually distinguished from innovation in particular, where the emphasis is on implementation. Academics and authors Teresa Amabile and Michael Pratt defined creativity as the production of novel and useful ideas and innovation as the implementation of creative ideas, while the OECD and Eurostat stated that "innovation is more than a new idea or an invention; an innovation requires implementation, either by being put into active use or by being made available for use by other parties, firms, individuals, or organizations."

There is also emotional creativity, which is described as a pattern of cognitive abilities and personality traits related to originality and appropriateness in emotional experience.

From an interdisciplinary point a view, creativity can serve to increase neuronal connectivity, cognitive and emotional coherence as well as social cohesion. In this respect, creativity can help people cope with despair, hate and violence.

== Conceptual history ==
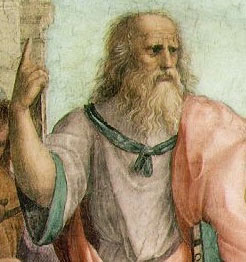
Greek philosophers like Plato rejected the concept of creativity, preferring to see art as a form of discovery. When asked in The Republic, "Will we say, of a painter, that he makes something?", Plato answers, "Certainly not, he merely imitates."

=== Ancient ===
Most ancient cultures, including ancient Greece, ancient China, and ancient India, lacked the concept of creativity, seeing art as a form of discovery rather than creation. The ancient Greeks had no terms for "to create" or "creator" except for the expression poiein (to make), which only applied to poiesis (poetry) and to the poietes (poet, or "maker", who made it). Plato did not believe in art as a form of creation. He asks in the Republic, "Will we say of a painter that he makes something?" He answers, "Certainly not, he merely imitates."

It is commonly argued that the notion of "creativity" originated in Western cultures through Christianity, as a matter of divine inspiration. According to scholars, the earliest Western conception of creativity was the Biblical story of the creation given in Genesis. However, this is not creativity in the modern sense, which did not arise until the Renaissance. In the Judeo-Christian-Islamic tradition, creativity was the sole province of God; humans were not considered to have the ability to create something new except as an expression of God's work. A similar concept existed in Greek culture, where the Muses were seen as mediating inspiration from the gods. Romans and Greeks invoked the concept of an external creative "daemon" (Greek) or "genius" (Latin), linked to the sacred or the divine. However, none of these views are similar to the modern concept of creativity, and the rejection of creativity in favor of discovery and the belief that individual creation was a conduit of the divine would dominate the West until the Renaissance and even later.

=== Renaissance ===
It was during the Renaissance that creativity was first conceived not as a conduit from the divine, but as arising from the abilities of "great men". This could be attributed to the leading intellectual movement of the time, aptly named humanism, which developed an intensely anthropocentric outlook on the world, valuing the intellect and achievement of the individual. From this philosophy arose the Renaissance man (or polymath), an individual who embodies the principles of humanism in their ceaseless courtship with knowledge and creation. One of the most well-known and immensely accomplished examples is Leonardo da Vinci.

=== From the 17th to the 19th centuries ===
However, the shift from divine inspiration to the abilities of the individual was gradual and would not become immediately apparent until the Age of Enlightenment. By the 18th century, creativity (notably in aesthetics) linked with the concept of imagination became more frequent. In the writing of Thomas Hobbes, imagination became a key element of human cognition. William Duff was one of the first to identify imagination as a quality of genius, typifying the separation being made between talent (productive, but not breaking new ground) and genius.

As an independent topic of study, creativity received little attention until the 19th century. Psychologist Mark Runco and Robert Albert argue that creativity as the subject of proper study began seriously to emerge in the late 19th century with the increased interest in individual differences inspired by the arrival of Darwinism. In particular, they refer to the work of Francis Galton, who, through his eugenicist outlook, took a keen interest in the heritability of intelligence, with creativity taken as an aspect of genius.

=== Modern ===
In the late 19th and early 20th centuries, leading mathematicians and scientists such as Hermann von Helmholtz (1896) and Henri Poincaré (1908) began to reflect on and publicly discuss their creative processes. The insights of Poincaré and von Helmholtz inspired the accounts of the creative process by pioneering theorists such as Graham Wallas and Max Wertheimer. In his work Art of Thought, published in 1926, Wallas presented one of the first models of the creative process. In the Wallas model, creative insights and illuminations may be explained by a process consisting of five stages:

1. preparation (preparatory work on a problem that focuses the individual's mind on the problem and explores the problem's dimensions),
2. incubation (in which the problem is internalized into the unconscious mind although nothing appears externally to be happening),
3. intimation (the creative person gets a "feeling" that a solution is on its way),
4. illumination or insight (in which the creative idea bursts forth from its preconscious processing into conscious awareness);
5. verification (in which the idea is consciously verified, elaborated, and then applied).

Wallas's model is also often treated as four stages, with "intimation" seen as a sub-stage.

Wallas considered creativity to be a legacy of the evolutionary process, which allowed humans to quickly adapt to rapidly changing environments. Simonton provides an updated perspective on this view in his book, Origins of Genius: Darwinian Perspectives on Creativity.

In 1927, mathematician and philosopher Alfred North Whitehead gave the Gifford Lectures at the University of Edinburgh, later published as Process and Reality. He is credited with having coined the term "creativity" to serve as the ultimate category of his metaphysical scheme.

Although psychometric studies of creativity had been conducted by The London School of Psychology as early as 1927 with the work of H.L. Hargreaves into the Faculty of Imagination. The formal psychometric measurement of creativity, from the standpoint of orthodox psychological literature, is usually considered to have begun with psychologist J.P. Guilford's address to the American Psychological Association in 1950. That address helped to popularize the study of creativity and to focus attention on scientific approaches to conceptualizing creativity. Statistical analyzes led to the recognition of creativity as an aspect of human cognition separate from IQ-type intelligence, under the study of which it had previously been subsumed. Guilford's work suggested that above a threshold level of IQ, the relationship between creativity and classically measured intelligence broke down.

=== Across cultures ===
Creativity is viewed differently in different countries. For example, cross-cultural research centered in Hong Kong found that Westerners view creativity more in terms of the individual attributes of a person, such as their aesthetic taste, while Chinese people view creativity more in terms of the social influence of creative people (i.e. what they can contribute to society). Mpofu, et al., surveyed 28 African languages and found that 27 had no word which directly translated to "creativity", with Arabic being the exception. The linguistic relativity hypothesis (i.e. that language can affect thought) suggests that the lack of an equivalent word for "creativity" may affect the views of creativity among speakers of such languages. However, more research would be needed to establish this, and there is certainly no suggestion that this linguistic difference makes people any less—or more—creative. Nevertheless, it is true that there has been very little research on creativity in Africa and Latin America. Creativity has been more thoroughly researched in the northern hemisphere, but there are cultural differences between northern countries. In Scandinavia, creativity is seen as an individual attitude that helps people cope with life's challenges, while in Germany, creativity is seen more as a process that can be applied to help solve problems.

== Classification ==
=== "Four C" model ===
Psychologists James Kaufman and Ronald Beghetto introduced a "four C" model of creativity. The four "C's" are:

1. mini-c ("transformative learning" involving "personally meaningful interpretations of experiences, actions, and insights").
2. little-c (everyday problem-solving and creative expression).
3. Pro-C (exhibited by people who are professionally or vocationally creative, though not necessarily eminent).
4. Big-C (creativity considered great in a given field).

This model was intended to help accommodate models and theories of creativity that stressed competence as an essential component and a historic transformation of a creative domain as the highest mark of creativity. It also, the authors argued, made a useful framework for analyzing creative processes in individuals.

The contrast signified by the terms "Big C" and "little C" has been widely used. Kozbelt, Beghetto, and Runco used a little-c/Big-C model to review major theories of creativity. Margaret Boden distinguished between h-creativity (historical) and p-creativity (personal).

Ken Robinson and Anna Craft focused on creativity in a general population, particularly with respect to education. Craft makes a similar distinction between "high" and "little c" creativity and cites Robinson as referring to "high" and "democratic" creativity. Mihaly Csikszentmihalyi defined creativity in terms of individuals judged to have made significant creative and perhaps domain-changing contributions. Simonton analyzed the career trajectories of eminent creative people in order to map patterns and predictors of creative productivity.

=== "Four P's" aspects ===
Theories of creativity (and empirical investigations of why some people are more creative than others) have focused on a variety of aspects. The dominant factors are usually identified as "the four P's," a framework first put forward by Mel Rhodes:

Process
A focus on process is shown in cognitive approaches that try to describe thought mechanisms and techniques for creative thinking. Theories invoking divergent rather than convergent thinking (such as that of Guilford), or those describing the staging of the creative process (such as that of Wallas) are primarily theories of the creative process.
Product
A focus on a creative product usually attempts to assess creative output, whether for psychometrics (see below) or to understand why some objects are considered creative. It is from a consideration of product that the standard definition of creativity as the production of something both novel and useful arises.
Person
A focus on the nature of the creative person considers more general intellectual habits, such as openness, levels of ideation, autonomy, expertise, exploratory behavior, and so on.
Press and place
A focus on place (or press) considers the circumstances in which creativity flourishes, such as degrees of autonomy, access to resources, and the nature of gatekeepers. Creative lifestyles are characterized by nonconforming attitudes and behaviors, as well as flexibility.

=== "Five A's" aspects ===
In 2013, based on a sociocultural critique of the Four-P's model as individualistic, static, and decontextualized, psychology professor and author Vlad Petre Glăveanu proposed a "Five A's" model consisting of actor, action, artifact, audience, and affordance. In this model, the actor is the person with attributes but who is also located within social networks; action is the process of creativity not only in internal cognitive terms but also external, bridging the gap between ideation and implementation; artifacts emphasize how creative products typically represent cumulative innovations over time rather than abrupt discontinuities; and "press/place" is divided into audience and affordance, which consider the interdependence of the creative individual with the social and material world, respectively. Although not supplanting the Four P's model in creativity research, the Five A's model has exerted influence over the direction of some creativity research, and has been credited with bringing coherence to studies across a number of creative domains.

== Process theories ==
There has been significant research conducted in the fields of psychology and cognitive science towards better understanding the processes by which creativity occurs. The results of these studies have led to several possible explanations of the sources and methods of creativity.

=== Incubation ===
"Incubation" is a temporary break from creative problem solving that can result in insight. Empirical research has investigated whether, as the concept of "incubation" in Wallas's model implies, a period of interruption or rest from a problem may aid creative problem-solving. Early work proposed that creative solutions to problems arise mysteriously from the unconscious mind while the conscious mind is occupied with other tasks. This hypothesis is included in Csikszentmihalyi's five-phase model of the creative process, which describes incubation as a time when one's unconscious takes over. This was supposed to allow for unique connections to be made without the conscious mind trying to make logical order out of the problem.

Ward listed various hypotheses that have been advanced to explain why incubation may aid creative problem-solving and notes how some empirical evidence is consistent with a different hypothesis: incubation aids creative problems in that it enables "forgetting" of misleading clues. The absence of incubation may lead the problem solver to become fixated on inappropriate problem-solving strategies.

=== Divergent thinking ===
J. P. Guilford drew a distinction between convergent and divergent production, or convergent and divergent thinking. Convergent thinking involves aiming for a single, correct, or best solution to a problem (e.g. "How can we get a crewed rocket to land on the moon safely and within budget?"). Divergent thinking, on the other hand, involves the creative generation of multiple answers to an open-ended prompt (e.g. "How can a chair be used?"). Divergent thinking is sometimes used as a synonym for creativity in psychological literature or is considered the necessary precursor to creativity. However, as Runco pointed out, there is a clear distinction between creative thinking and divergent thinking. Creative thinking focuses on the production, combination, and assessment of ideas to formulate something new and unique, while divergent thinking focuses on conceiving a variety of ideas that are not necessarily new or unique. Other researchers have occasionally used the terms flexible thinking or fluid intelligence, which are also roughly similar to (but not synonymous with) creativity. While convergent and divergent thinking differ greatly in terms of approach to problem solving, it is believed that both are employed to some degree in solving most real-world problems.

=== Geneplore model ===
In 1992, Finke, et al., proposed the "Geneplore model", in which creativity takes place in two phases: a generative phase, where an individual constructs mental representations called "preinventive" structures, and an exploratory phase where those structures are used to come up with creative ideas. Some evidence shows that when people use their imagination to develop new ideas, those ideas are structured in predictable ways in accordance with properties of existing categories and concepts. Weisberg argued, in contrast, that creativity involves ordinary cognitive processes yielding extraordinary results.

=== Explicit–implicit interaction theory ===
Helie and Sun proposed a framework for understanding creativity in problem solving, namely the explicit–implicit interaction (EII) theory of creativity. This theory attempts to provide a more unified explanation of relevant phenomena (in part by reinterpreting/integrating various fragmentary existing theories of incubation and insight).

The EII theory relies mainly on five basic principles:

1. co-existence of, and the difference between, explicit and implicit knowledge
2. simultaneous involvement of implicit and explicit processes in most tasks
3. redundant representation of explicit and implicit knowledge
4. integration of the results of explicit and implicit processing
5. iterative (and possibly bidirectional) processing

A computational implementation of the theory was developed based on the CLARION cognitive architecture and used to simulate relevant human data. This work is an initial step in the development of process-based theories of creativity, encompassing incubation, insight, and various other related phenomena.

=== Conceptual blending ===
In The Act of Creation, Arthur Koestler introduced the concept of "bisociation" – that creativity arises as a result of the intersection of two quite different frames of reference. In the 1990s, various approaches in cognitive science that dealt with metaphor, analogy, and structure mapping converged, and a new integrative approach to the study of creativity in science, art, and humor emerged under the label conceptual blending.

=== Honing theory ===
Honing theory, developed principally by psychologist Liane Gabora, posits that creativity arises due to the self-organizing, self-mending nature of a worldview. The creative process is a way by which the individual hones (and re-hones) an integrated worldview. Honing theory places emphasis not only on the externally visible creative outcome but also on the internal cognitive restructuring and repair of the worldview brought about by the creative process. When one is faced with a creatively demanding task, there is an interaction between one's conception of the task and one's worldview. The conception of the task changes through interaction with the worldview, and the worldview changes through interaction with the task. This interaction is reiterated until the task is complete, at which point the task is conceived of differently and the worldview is subtly or drastically transformed, following the natural tendency of a worldview to attempt to resolve dissonance and seek internal consistency amongst its components, whether they be ideas, attitudes, or bits of knowledge. Dissonance in a person's worldview is, in some cases, generated by viewing their peers' creative outputs, and, so, people pursue their own creative endeavors to restructure their worldviews and reduce dissonance. This shift in worldview and cognitive restructuring through creative acts has also been considered as a way to explain possible benefits of creativity for mental health. The theory also addresses challenges not addressed by other theories of creativity, such as the factors guiding restructuring and the evolution of creative works.

A central feature of honing theory is the notion of a "potentiality state". Honing theory posits that creative thought proceeds not by searching through and randomly "mutating" predefined possibilities but by drawing upon associations that exist due to overlap in the distributed neural-cell assemblies that participate in the encoding of experiences in memory. Midway through the creative process, one may have made associations between the current task and previous experiences but not yet disambiguated which aspects of those previous experiences are relevant to the current task. Thus, the creative idea may feel "half-baked". At that point, it can be said to be in a potentiality state, because how it will actualize depends on the different internally or externally generated contexts it interacts with.

Honing theory is held to explain certain phenomena not dealt with by other theories of creativity—for example, how different works by the same creator exhibit a recognizable style or "voice" even in different creative outlets. This is not predicted by theories of creativity that emphasize chance processes or the accumulation of expertise, but it is predicted by honing theory, according to which personal style reflects the creator's uniquely structured worldview. Another example is the environmental stimulus for creativity. Creativity is commonly considered to be fostered by a supportive, nurturing, and trustworthy environment conducive to self-actualization. In line with this idea, Gabora posits that creativity is a product of culture and that our social interactions evolve our culture in way that promotes creativity.

=== Everyday imaginative thought ===
In everyday thought, people often spontaneously imagine alternatives to reality when they think "if only...". Their counterfactual thinking is viewed as an example of everyday creative processes. It has been proposed that the creation of counterfactual alternatives to reality depends on cognitive processes that are similar to rational thought.

Imaginative thought in everyday life can be categorized based on whether it involves perceptual or motor-related mental imagery, novel combinatorial processing, or altered psychological states. This classification aids in understanding the neural foundations and practical implications of imagination.

Creative thinking is a central aspect of everyday life, encompassing both controlled and undirected processes. This includes divergent thinking and stage models, highlighting the importance of extra- and meta-cognitive contributions to imaginative thought.

Brain-network dynamics play a crucial role in creative cognition. The default and executive control networks in the brain cooperate during creative tasks, suggesting a complex interaction between these networks in facilitating everyday imaginative thought.

=== Dialectical theory ===
The term "dialectical theory of creativity" dates back to psychoanalyst Daniel Dervin and was later developed into an interdisciplinary theory. This theory starts with the ancient concept that creativity takes place in an interplay between order and chaos. Similar ideas can be found in neuroscience and psychology. Neurobiologically, it can be shown that the creative process takes place in a dynamic interplay between coherence and incoherence that leads to new and usable neuronal networks. Psychology shows how the dialectics of convergent and focused thinking with divergent and associative thinking leads to new ideas and products.

Personality traits such as the "Big Five" seem to bedialectically intertwined in the creative process: emotional instability versus stability, extraversion versus introversion, openness versus reserve, agreeableness versus antagonism, and disinhibition versus constraint. The dialectical theory of creativity also applies to counseling and psychotherapy.

=== Neuroeconomic framework ===
Lin and Vartanian developed a neurobiological description of creative cognition. This interdisciplinary framework integrates theoretical principles and empirical results from neuroeconomics, reinforcement learning, cognitive neuroscience, and neurotransmission research on the locus coeruleus system. It describes how decision-making processes studied by neuroeconomists as well as activity in the locus coeruleus system underlie creative cognition and the large-scale brain network dynamics associated with creativity. It suggests that creativity is an optimization and utility maximization problem that requires individuals to determine the optimal way to exploit and explore ideas (e.g., the multi-armed bandit problem). This utility-maximization process is thought to be mediated by the locus coeruleus system, and this creativity framework describes how tonic and phasic locus coeruleus activities work in conjunction to facilitate the exploiting and exploring of creative ideas. This framework not only explains previous empirical results but also makes novel and falsifiable predictions at different levels of analysis (ranging from neurobiological to cognitive and personality differences).

=== Behaviorism theory ===
B.F. Skinner attributed creativity to accidental behaviors that are reinforced by the environment. In behaviorism, creativity can be understood as novel or unusual behaviors that are reinforced if they produce a desired outcome. Spontaneous behaviors by living creatures are thought to reflect past learned behaviors. In this way, a behaviorist may say that prior learning caused novel behaviors to be reinforced many times over, and the individual has been shaped to produce increasingly novel behaviors. A creative person, according to this definition, is someone who has been reinforced more often for novel behaviors than others. Behaviorists suggest that anyone can be creative, they just need to be reinforced to learn to produce novel behaviors.

=== Investment theory ===
The "investment theory of creativity" suggests that many individual and environmental factors must exist in precise ways for extremely high, as opposed to average, levels of creativity to result. In the "investment" sense, a person with their particular characteristics in their particular environment may see an opportunity to devote their time and energy to something that has been overlooked by others. The creative person develops an undervalued or under-recognized idea to the point where it is established as a new and creative idea. Just as in the financial world, some investments are worth the buy-in, while others are less productive and do not generate returns to the extent that the investor expected. This "investment theory of creativity" asserts that creativity might rely to some extent on the right investment of effort being added to a field at the right time in the right way.

=== Computational creativity ===
Jürgen Schmidhuber's formal theory of creativity postulates that creativity, curiosity, and interestingness are by-products of a simple computational principle for measuring and optimizing learning progress.

Consider an agent able to manipulate its environment and thus its own sensory inputs. The agent can use a black box optimization method such as reinforcement learning to learn, through informed trial and error, sequences of actions that maximize the expected sum of its future reward signals. There are extrinsic reward signals for achieving externally given goals, such as finding food when hungry. But for Schmidhuber's objective function to be maximized also includes an additional, intrinsic term to model "wow-effects". This non-standard term motivates purely creative behavior of the agent, even when there are no external goals.

A wow-effect is formally defined as follows: as the agent is creating and predicting and encoding the continually growing history of actions and sensory inputs, it keeps improving the predictor or encoder, which can be implemented as an artificial neural network, or some other machine learning device, that can exploit regularities in the data to improve its performance over time. The improvements can be measured precisely, by computing the difference in computational costs (storage size, number of required synapses, errors, time) needed to encode new observations before and after learning. This difference depends on the encoder's present subjective knowledge, which changes over time, but the theory formally takes this into account. The cost difference measures the strength of the present wow-effect due to sudden improvements in data compression or computational speed. It becomes an intrinsic reward signal for the action selector. The objective function thus motivates the action optimizer to create action sequences that cause more wow-effects.

Irregular, random data (or noise) do not permit any wow-effects or learning progress, and thus are "boring" by nature (providing no reward). Already-known and predictable regularities also are boring. Temporarily interesting are only the initially unknown, novel, regular patterns in both actions and observations. This motivates the agent to perform continual, open-ended, active, creative exploration.

Schmidhuber's work is highly influential in intrinsic motivation, which has emerged as a research topic in the study of artificial intelligence and robotics.

According to Schmidhuber, his objective function explains the activities of scientists, artists, and comedians. For example, physicists are motivated to create experiments leading to observations that obey previously unpublished physical laws, permitting better data compression. Likewise, composers receive intrinsic reward for creating non-arbitrary melodies with unexpected but regular harmonies that permit wow-effects through data compression improvements. Similarly, a comedian gets an intrinsic reward for "inventing a novel joke with an unexpected punch line, related to the beginning of the story in an initially unexpected but quickly learnable way that also allows for better compression of the perceived data."

Schmidhuber augured that computer hardware advances would greatly scale up rudimentary artificial scientists and artists. He used the theory to create low-complexity art and an attractive human face.

== Personal assessment ==
=== Psychometric approaches ===
==== History ====
J. P. Guilford's group, which pioneered the modern psychometric study of creativity, constructed several performance-based tests to measure creativity in 1967, including asking participants to write original titles for a story with a given plot, asking participants to come up with unusual uses for everyday objects such as bricks, and asking participants to generate a list of consequences of unexpected events, such as the loss of gravity. Guilford was trying to create a model for intellect as a whole, but in doing so, he also created a model for creativity. Guilford assumed that creativity was not an abstract concept, which was an important assumption needed for creativity research. The idea that creativity was a category, rather than a single concept, enabled other researchers to look at creativity from a new perspective.

Additionally, Guilford hypothesized one of the first models that specified the components of creativity. He explained that creativity was a result of having three qualities: the ability to recognize problems, "fluency", and "flexibility". "Fluency" encompassed "ideational fluency", or the ability to rapidly produce a variety of ideas fulfilling stated requirements; "associational fluency", or the ability to generate a list of words associated with a given word; and "expressional fluency", or the ability to organize words into larger units such as phrases, sentences, and paragraphs. "Flexibility" encompassed both "spontaneous flexibility", or the general ability to be flexible, and "adaptive flexibility", or the ability to produces responses that are novel and of high quality.

This represents the base model which several researchers would alter to produce their own new theories of creativity years later. Building on Guilford's work, tests were developed, sometimes called "divergent thinking" (DT) tests, which have been both praised and criticized. One example is the Torrance Tests of Creative Thinking developed in 1966. These test set forth tasks requiring divergent thinking, as well as other problem-solving skills, the tests being scored according to four categories: "fluency", the total number of meaningful, and relevant, ideas generated; "flexibility", the number of different categories of responses; "originality", the statistical rarity of the responses; and "elaboration", the amount of detail given.

==== Computer scoring ====
Considerable progress has been made in the automated scoring of divergent-thinking tests, using a semantic approach. When compared to human raters, natural language processing (NLP) techniques are reliable and valid for the scoring of originality. Computer programs were able to achieve a correlation to human graders of 0.60 and 0.72.

Semantic networks also devise originality scores that yield significant correlations with socio-personal measures. A team of researchers led by James C. Kaufman and Mark A. Runco combined expertise in creativity research, natural language processing, computational linguistics, and statistical data analysis to devise a scalable system for computerized automated testing: the SparcIt Creativity Index Testing system. This system enabled automated scoring of DT tests that is reliable, objective, and scalable, thus addressing most of the issues of DT tests that had been found and reported. The resultant computer system was able to achieve a correlation to human graders of 0.73.

=== Social-personality approaches ===
Researchers have taken a social-personality approach by using personality traits such as independence of judgement, self-confidence, attraction to complexity, aesthetic orientation, and risk-taking as measures of personal creativity. Within the framework of the Big Five personality traits, a consistent few of these traits have emerged as being correlated to creativity. Openness to experience is consistently related to a host of different assessments of creativity. Investigation of the other Big Five traits has demonstrated subtle differences between different domains of creativity. Compared to non-artists, artists tend to have higher levels of openness to experience and lower levels of conscientiousness, while scientists are more open to experience, conscientious, and higher in the confidence-dominance facets of extraversion compared to non-scientists.

=== Self-reporting questionnaires ===
Biographical methods use quantitative characteristics, such as the number of publications, patents, or artistic performances that can be credited to a person. While this method was originally developed for highly creative personalities, today it is also available as self-report questionnaires supplemented with frequent, less outstanding creative behaviors such as writing a short story or creating recipes. The self-report questionnaire most frequently used in research is the Creative Achievement Questionnaire, a self-report test that measures creative achievement across ten domains, which was described in 2005 and shown to be reliable when compared to other measures of creativity and to independent evaluations of creative output.

== Factors ==
=== Intelligence ===
The potential relationship between creativity and intelligence has been of interest since the last half of the twentieth century, when many influential studies extensively studied both. This joint focus highlighted both the theoretical and practical importance of the relationship: researchers were interested in not only if the two qualities were related, but also how and why.

There are multiple theories accounting for their relationship, with there being three main theories. Threshold theory states that intelligence is a necessary, but not sufficient, condition for creativity, and that there is a moderate positive relationship between creativity and intelligence until IQ ~120. Certification theory states that creativity is not intrinsically related to intelligence. Instead, individuals are required to meet the requisite level of intelligence in order to gain a certain level of education or work, which in turn offers the opportunity to be creative. In this theory, displays of creativity are moderated by intelligence. Interference theory states, in contrast, that extremely high intelligence might interfere with creative ability.

Sternberg and O'Hara proposed a different framework of five possible relationships between creativity and intelligence: that creativity was a subset of intelligence; that intelligence was a subset of creativity; that the two constructs overlapped; that they were both part of the same construct (coincident sets); or that they were distinct constructs (disjoint sets).

==== Creativity as a subset of intelligence ====
A number of researchers include creativity, either explicitly or implicitly, as a key component of intelligence, for example:

- Sternberg's Theory of Successful Intelligence includes creativity as a main component and comprises three sub-theories: contextual (analytic), contextual (practical), and experiential (creative). Experiential sub-theory—the ability to use pre-existing knowledge and skills to solve new and novel problems—is directly related to creativity.
- The Cattell–Horn–Carroll theory (CHC) includes creativity as a subset of intelligence, associated with the broad group factor of long-term storage and retrieval (Glr). Glr narrows abilities relating to creativity include ideational fluency, associational fluency, and originality/creativity. Silvia et al. conducted a study to look at the relationship between divergent thinking and verbal fluency tests and reported that both fluency and originality in divergent thinking were significantly affected by the broad-level Glr factor. Martindale extended the CHC-theory by proposing that people who are creative are also selective in their processing speed. Martindale argues that in the creative process, larger amounts of information are processed more slowly in the early stages, and as a person begins to understand the problem, the processing speed is increased.
- The Dual Process Theory of Intelligence posits a two-factor or type model of intelligence. Type 1 is a conscious process and concerns goal-directed thoughts. Type 2 is an unconscious process, and concerns spontaneous cognition, which encompasses daydreaming and implicit learning ability. Kaufman argues that creativity occurs as a result of Type 1 and Type 2 processes working together in combination. Each type in the creative process can be used to varying degrees.

==== Intelligence as a subset of creativity ====
In this relationship model, intelligence is a key component in the development of creativity, for example:

- Sternberg & Lubart's Investment Theory, using the metaphor of a stock market, demonstrates that creative thinkers are like good investors—they buy low and sell high (in their ideas). Like undervalued or low-valued stock, creative individuals generate unique ideas that are initially rejected by other people. The creative individual has to persevere and convince others of the idea's value. After convincing others, and thus increasing the idea's value, the creative individual "sells high" by leaving the idea with the other people and moving on to generate another idea. According to this theory, six distinct, but related elements contribute to successful creativity: intelligence, knowledge, thinking styles, personality, motivation, and environment. Intelligence is just one of the six factors that can, either solely or in conjunction with the other five factors, generate creative thoughts.
- Amabile's Componential Model of Creativity posits three within-individual components needed for creativity—domain-relevant skills, creativity-relevant processes, and task motivation—and one component external to the individual—their surrounding social environment. Creativity requires the confluence of all components. High creativity will result when a person is intrinsically motivated, possesses both a high level of domain-relevant skills and has high skills in creative thinking, and is working in a highly creative environment.
- The Amusement Park Theoretical Model is a four-step theory in which domain-specific and generalist views are integrated into a model of creativity. The researchers make use of the metaphor of the amusement park to demonstrate that, within each of the following creative levels, intelligence plays a key role:
  - To get into the amusement park, there are initial requirements (e.g., time and transportation needed to go to the park). Initial requirements (such as intelligence) are necessary, but not sufficient for creativity. They are more like prerequisites for creativity, and if a person does not possess the basic level of the initial requirement (intelligence), then they will not be able to generate creative thoughts and behaviour.
  - Secondly, there are the subcomponents—general thematic areas—that increase in specificity. Like choosing which type of amusement park to visit (e.g., a zoo or a water park), these areas relate to the areas in which someone could be creative (e.g., poetry).
  - Thirdly, there are specific domains. After choosing the type of park to visit (e.g., if one chooses a waterpark, that person has to choose which specific park to go to). For example, within the poetry domain there are many different forms (e.g., free verse, riddles, sonnets, etc.).
  - Lastly, there are micro-domains. These are the specific tasks that reside within each domain (e.g., individual rides at the waterpark equate to individual lines in a poem in free-verse).

==== Creativity and intelligence as overlapping yet distinct constructs ====
These concepts posit creativity and intelligence as distinct, but intersecting constructs, for example:

- In Renzulli's Three-Ring Conception of Giftedness, giftedness is an overlap of above-average intellectual ability, creativity, and task commitment. Under this view, creativity and intelligence are distinct constructs, but they overlap under the correct conditions.
- In the PASS theory of intelligence, the planning component—the ability to solve problems, make decisions, and take action—strongly overlaps with the concept of creativity.
- Threshold Theory (TT) derives from a number of previous research findings that suggested that a threshold exists in the relationship between creativity and intelligence—both constructs are moderately positively correlated up to an IQ of ~120. Above this threshold, if there is a relationship at all, it is small and weak. TT posits that a moderate level of intelligence is necessary for creativity.

==== Creativity and intelligence as coincident sets ====
Under this view, researchers posit that there are no differences in the mechanisms underlying creativity from those used in normal problem solving, and in normal problem solving there is no need for creativity. Thus, creativity and intelligence (problem solving) are the same thing. Perkins referred to this as the "nothing-special" view.

==== Creativity and intelligence as disjoint sets ====
In this view, creativity and intelligence are completely different, unrelated constructs. Along with the coincident set view, this is quite a rare position taken within the literature.

=== Affective influence ===
Some theories suggest that creativity may be particularly susceptible to affective influence. The term "affect" in this context refers to liking or disliking key aspects of the subject in question. This work largely follows from findings in psychology regarding the ways in which affective states are involved in human judgment and decision-making.

According to Alice Isen, positive affect has three primary effects on cognitive activity. First, it makes additional cognitive material available for processing, increasing the number of cognitive elements available for association. Second, it leads to defocused attention and a more complex cognitive context, increasing the breadth of those elements that are treated as relevant to the problem. Third, it increases cognitive flexibility, increasing the probability that diverse cognitive elements will in fact become associated. Together, these processes enable creativity.

Barbara Fredrickson, in her broaden-and-build model, suggests that positive emotions, such as joy and love, broaden a person's available repertoire of cognitions and actions, thus enhancing creativity.

According to these researchers, positive emotions increase the number of cognitive elements available for association (attention scope) and the number of elements that are relevant to the problem (cognitive scope). Day-by-day psychological experiences—including emotions, perceptions, and motivation—significantly impact creative performance. Creativity is higher when emotions and perceptions are more positive and when intrinsic motivation is stronger.

Some meta-analyses, such as Baas, et al., (2008) analyzing 66 studies of creativity and affect, support the link between creativity and positive affect.

In support of a more nuanced view, some empirical findings have shown that emotional ambivalence (i.e., the simultaneous experience of positive and negative emotions), mind-body dissonance (i.e., the experience of the bodily expression and mental experience of emotions contradicting each other), or affective shift (i.e., the experience of an episode of negative affect followed by a decrease in negative affect and an increase in positive affect) can also enable creative thinking.

=== Mental health ===
Links have been identified between creativity and mood disorders, particularly manic-depressive disorder (a.k.a. bipolar disorder) and depressive disorder (a.k.a. unipolar disorder). However, different artists have described mental illness as having both positive and negative effects on their work. In general, people who have worked in the arts industry throughout history have faced many environmental factors that are associated with, and can sometimes influence, mental illness—things such as poverty, persecution, social alienation, psychological trauma, substance abuse, and high stress.

==== Studies ====
A study by psychologist J. Philippe Rushton found creativity to correlate with intelligence and psychoticism. Another study found creativity to be greater in people with schizotypal personality disorder than in people with either schizophrenia or those without mental health disorders. While divergent thinking was associated with activation of both sides of the prefrontal cortex, schizotypal individuals were found to have much greater activation of their right prefrontal cortex. That study hypothesized that such individuals are better at accessing both hemispheres, allowing them to make novel associations at a faster rate. Consistent with this hypothesis, ambidexterity is also more common in people with schizotypal personality disorder and schizophrenia. Three studies by Mark Batey and Adrian Furnham demonstrated the relationships between schizotypal personality disorder, hypomanic personality, and several different measures of creativity.

A study of 300,000 persons with schizophrenia, bipolar disorder, or unipolar depression, and their relatives, found overrepresentation in creative professions of those with bipolar disorder as well as for undiagnosed siblings of those with schizophrenia or bipolar disorder. There was no overall overrepresentation, but overrepresentation for artistic occupations, among those diagnosed with schizophrenia. There was no association for those with unipolar depression or their relatives.

Another study, involving more than one million people, conducted by Swedish researchers at the Karolinska Institute, reported a number of correlations between creative occupations and mental illnesses. Writers had a higher risk of anxiety and bipolar disorders, schizophrenia, unipolar depression, and substance abuse, and were almost twice as likely as the general population to kill themselves. Dancers and photographers were also more likely to have bipolar disorder. Those in the creative professions were no more likely to have psychiatric disorders than other people, although they were more likely to have a close relative with a disorder, including anorexia and, to some extent, autism, the Journal of Psychiatric Research reported.

Nancy Andreasen was one of the first researchers to carry out a large-scale study of creativity and whether mental illnesses have an impact on someone's ability to be creative. She expected to find a link between creativity and schizophrenia, but her research sample (the book-authors she pooled) had no history of schizophrenia. Her findings instead showed that 80% of the creative group previously had some episode of mental illness in their lifetime. When she performed follow-up studies over a 15-year period, she found that 43% of the authors had bipolar disorder, compared to 1% of the general public.

In 1989 another study, by Kay Redfield Jamison, reaffirmed those statistics, with 38% of her sample of authors having a history of mood disorders. Anthony Storr, a prominent psychiatrist, remarked:

The creative process can be a way of protecting the individual against being overwhelmed by depression, a means of regaining a sense of mastery in those who have lost it, and, to a varying extent, a way of repairing the self-damaged by bereavement or by the loss of confidence in human relationships which accompanies depression from whatever cause.

==== Bipolar disorders ====
People diagnosed with bipolar disorder report themselves as having a larger range of emotional understanding, heightened states of perception, and an ability to connect better with those in the world around them. Other reported traits include higher rates of productivity, higher senses of self-awareness, and greater empathy. Those who have bipolar disorder also understand their own sense of heightened creativity and ability to get immense numbers of tasks done all at once. In one study, of 219 participants (aged 19 to 63) diagnosed with bipolar disorder, 82% of them reported having elevated feelings of creativity during their hypomanic swings.

A study done by Shapiro and Weisberg also showed a positive correlation between the manic upswings of the cycles of bipolar disorder and the ability of an individual to be more creative. The data showed, however, that it was not the depressive swing that brings forth dark creative spurts, but the act of climbing out of the depressive episode that sparks creativity. The reason behind this spur of creative genius could come from the type of self-image that the person has during a time of hypomania. A hypomanic person may feel a bolstered sense of self-confidence, creative confidence, and sense of individualism.

==== Opinions ====
Vaitsa Giannouli believes that the creativity a person diagnosed with bipolar disorder feels comes as a form of "stress management". In the realm of music, one might be expressing one's stress or pains through the pieces one writes in order to better understand those same feelings. Famous authors and musicians, along with some actors, would often attribute their wild enthusiasm to something like a hypomanic state. The artistic side of society has been notorious for behaviors that are seen as maladapted to societal norms. Symptoms of bipolar disorder correlate with behaviors in high-profile creative personalities such as alcohol addiction; drug abuse including stimulants, depressants, hallucinogens and dissociatives, opioids, inhalants, and cannabis; difficulties in holding regular occupations; interpersonal problems; legal issues; and a high risk of suicide.

Robert Weisberg believes that the state of mania sets "free the powers of a thinker". He implies that not only has the person become more creative, but they have fundamentally changed the kind of thoughts they produce. In a study of poets, who are especially highly afflicted with bipolar disorders, over a period of three years those poets would have cycles of creating really creative and powerful works of poetry. The timelines over the three-year study looked at the poets' personal journals and their clinical records, and found that the timelines between their most powerful poems matched that of their upswings in bipolar disorder.

=== Personal traits ===
Creativity can be expressed in a variety of ways, depending on the uniqueness of people and environments. Theorists have suggested a number of different models of the creative person. However, the creativity-profiling approach must take into account the tension between predicting the creative profile of an individual, as characterized by the psychometric approach, and the evidence that group creativity is founded on diversity and difference.

From a personality-traits perspective, there are a number of traits that are associated with creativity in people. Creative people tend to be more open to new experiences, are more self-confident, are more ambitious, self-accepting, impulsive, driven, dominant, and hostile, compared to people who are less creative.

==== Divergent production ====
One characteristic of creative people, as measured by some psychologists, is what is called "divergent production"—the ability of a person to generate a diverse assortment, yet an appropriate amount, of responses to a given situation. One way to measure divergent production is by administering the Torrance Tests of Creative Thinking, which assess the diversity, quantity, and appropriateness of participants' responses to a variety of open-ended questions. Some researchers also emphasize how creative people are better at balancing between divergent and convergent production, which depends on an individual's innate preference or ability to explore and exploit ideas.

==== Dedication and expertise ====
Other researchers of creativity see that what distinguishes creative people as a cognitive process of dedication to problem-solving and developing expertise in the field of their creative expression. Hardworking people study the work of people before them in their milieu, become experts in their fields, and then have the ability to add to and build upon previous information in innovative and creative ways. In a study of projects by design students, students who had more knowledge of their subject on average exhibited greater creativity in carrying out their projects.

==== Motivation ====
A person's motivation may also be predictive of their level of creativity. Motivation stems from two different sources: intrinsic and extrinsic. Intrinsic motivation is an internal drive within a person to participate as a result of personal interest, desires, hopes, goals, etc. Extrinsic motivation is a drive from outside and might take the form of payment, rewards, fame, approval from others, etc. Although intrinsic and extrinsic motivation can both increase creativity in certain cases, strictly extrinsic motivation often impedes creativity in people.

=== Environment ===
In studying creative people in history, some common traits in lifestyle and environment are often found. Creative people often had supportive, but rigid and non-nurturing parents. Most had an interest in their field at an early age, and most had a seasoned mentor in their field of interest. Often the field they chose was relatively uncharted, allowing for their creativity to be better expressed. Most, but not all famous creative people devoted almost all of their time and energy into their craft leading to a creative breakthrough of fame. Much of their lives were marked with dedication and a cycle of hard-work and breakthroughs as a result of their determination.

== In different fields ==
=== Art ===
Creativity is a fundamental component of the creative arts and design practice. It allows artists and designers to generate innovative ideas, solve complex problems, create products and experiences that are meaningful and impactful, stay ahead of trends, and anticipate future needs. Author Austin Kleon asserts that all creative work builds on what came before. Embracing influences and educating oneself in the work of others is conducive to creativity.

=== Neuroscience ===
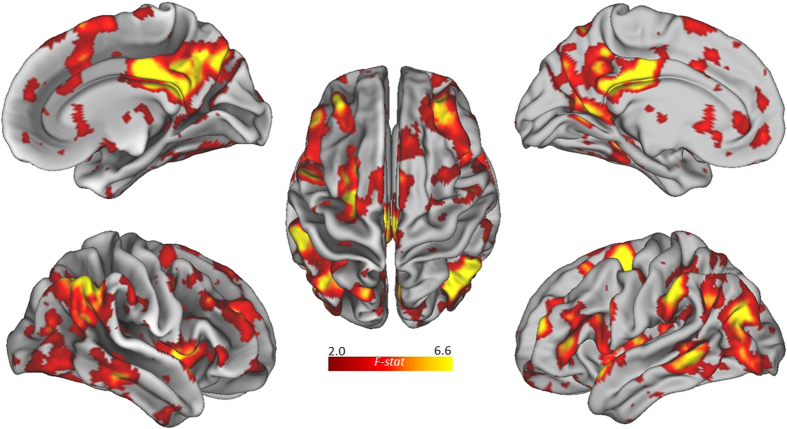
Distributed functional brain network associated with divergent thinking

The neuroscience of creativity looks at the operation of the brain during creative behavior. One article writes that "creative innovation might require coactivation and communication between regions of the brain that ordinarily are not strongly connected." People who excel at creative innovation tend to differ from others in three ways: first, they have a high level of specialized knowledge; second, they are capable of divergent thinking mediated by the frontal lobe; and, third, they are able to modulate neurotransmitters such as norepinephrine in their frontal lobe. Thus, the frontal lobe appears to be the part of the cortex that is most important for creativity.

A 2015 study of creativity found that it involves the interaction of multiple neural networks, including those that support associative thinking, along with other default mode network functions. In 2018, some experiments showed that when the brain suppresses obvious or "known" solutions, the outcome is solutions that are more creative. This suppression is mediated by alpha oscillations in the right temporal lobe and activity in the right frontal pole.

==== REM sleep ====
Creativity involves the forming of associative elements into new combinations that are useful or meet some requirement. Sleep aids this process. REM rather than NREM sleep appears to be responsible. This may be due to changes in cholinergic and noradrenergic neuromodulation that occurs during REM sleep. During this period of sleep, high levels of acetylcholine in the hippocampus suppress feedback from the hippocampus to the neocortex, and lower levels of acetylcholine and norepinephrine in the neocortex encourage the spread of associational activity within neocortical areas without control from the hippocampus. This is in contrast to waking consciousness, during which higher levels of norepinephrine and acetylcholine inhibit recurrent connections in the neocortex. REM sleep may aid creativity by allowing "neocortical structures to reorganize associative hierarchies, in which information from the hippocampus would be reinterpreted in relation to previous semantic representations or nodes."

==== Vandervert model ====
Vandervert described how the brain's frontal lobes and the cognitive functions of the cerebellum collaborate to facilitate creativity and innovation. Vandervert's explanation rests on considerable evidence that all processes of working memory (responsible for processing all thought) are adaptively modeled for increased efficiency by the cerebellum. The cerebellum (consisting of 100 billion neurons, which is more than in the entirety of the rest of the brain) also adaptively models all bodily movement for efficiency. The cerebellum's adaptive models of working memory processing are then fed back to especially frontal lobe working memory control processes, where creative and innovative thoughts arise. (Apparently, creative insight or the "aha" experience is then triggered in the temporal lobe.)

According to Vandervert, the details of creative adaptation begin in "forward" cerebellar models, which are anticipatory/exploratory controls for movement and thought. These cerebellar processing and control architectures have been termed Hierarchical Modular Selection and Identification for Control (HMOSAIC). New, hierarchically-arranged levels of the cerebellar control architecture (HMOSAIC) develop as mental mulling in working memory is extended over time. These new levels of the control architecture are fed forward to the frontal lobes. Since the cerebellum adaptively models all movement and all levels of thought and emotion, Vandervert's approach helps explain creativity and innovation in sports, art, music, the design of video games, technology, mathematics, the child prodigy, and thought in general.

Vandervert argues that when a person is confronted with a challenging new situation, visual-spatial working memory and speech-related working memory are decomposed and re-composed (fractionated) by the cerebellum and then blended in the cerebral cortex in an attempt to deal with the new situation. With repeated attempts to deal with challenging situations, the cerebro-cerebellar blending process continues to optimize the efficiency of how working memory deals with the situation or problem. He also argues that this is the same process (only involving visual-spatial working memory and pre-language vocalization) that led to the evolution of language in humans. Vandervert and Vandervert–Weathers have pointed out that this blending process, because it continuously optimizes efficiencies, constantly improves prototyping attempts toward the invention or innovation of new ideas, music, art, or technology. Prototyping, they argue, not only produces new products, it trains the cerebro-cerebellar pathways involved to become more efficient at prototyping itself. Furthermore, Vandervert and Vandervert-Weathers believe that this repetitive "mental prototyping", or mental rehearsal involving the cerebellum and the cerebral cortex, explains the success of the self-driven, individualized patterning of repetitions initiated by the teaching methods of the Khan Academy.

The model proposed by Vandervert has, however, received incisive critique from several authors.

==== Flaherty model ====
In 2005, Alice Flaherty presented a three-factor model of the creative drive. Drawing from evidence in brain imaging, drug studies, and lesion analysis, she described the creative drive as resulting from an interaction of the frontal lobes, the temporal lobes, and dopamine from the limbic system. The frontal lobes may be responsible for idea generation, and the temporal lobes for idea editing and evaluation. Abnormalities in the frontal lobe (such as depression or anxiety) generally decrease creativity, while abnormalities in the temporal lobe often increase creativity. High activity in the temporal lobe typically inhibits activity in the frontal lobe, and vice versa. High dopamine levels increase general arousal and goal-directed behaviors and reduce latent inhibition, with all three effects increasing the drive to generate ideas.

==== Lin and Vartanian model ====
In 2018, Lin and Vartanian proposed a neuroeconomic framework that precisely describes norepinephrine's role in creativity and modulating large-scale brain networks associated with creativity. This framework describes how neural activity in different brain regions and networks, such as the default mode network, track utility or subjective values of ideas.

=== Economics ===
Economic approaches to creativity have focused on three aspects – the impact of creativity on economic growth, methods of modeling markets for creativity, and the maximization of economic creativity (innovation).

In the early 20th century, Joseph Schumpeter introduced the economic theory of creative destruction to describe the way in which old ways of doing things are destroyed and replaced by the new. Some economists (such as Paul Romer) view creativity as an important element in the recombination of elements to produce new technologies and products and, consequently, economic growth. Creativity leads to capital, and creative products are protected by intellectual property laws.

Mark A. Runco and Daniel Rubenson have tried to describe a "psychoeconomic" model of creativity. In such a model, creativity is the product of endowments and active investments in creativity; the costs and benefits of bringing creative activity to market determine the supply of creativity. Such an approach has been criticized for its view of creativity consumption as always having positive utility, and for the way it prematurely analyzes the value of future innovations.

In his 2002 book, The Rise of the Creative Class, economist Richard Florida popularized the notion that regions with "3 T's of economic development: Technology, Talent, and Tolerance" also have high concentrations of creative professionals and tend to have a higher level of economic development.

=== Sociology ===
Creativity research for most of the twentieth century was dominated by psychology and business studies, with little work done in sociology. Since the turn of the millennium, there has been more attention paid by sociological researchers, but sociology has yet to establish creativity as a specific research field, with reviews of sociological research into creativity a rarity in high-impact literature.

While psychology has tended to focus on the individual as the locus of creativity, sociological research is directed more at the structures and context within which creative activity takes place, primarily based in sociology of culture, which finds its roots in the works of Marx, Durkheim, and Weber. This has meant a focus on the cultural and creative industries as sociological phenomena. Such research has covered a variety of areas, including the economics and production of culture, the role of creative industries in development, and the rise of the "creative class".

=== Education ===
For those who view the conventional system of schooling as stifling creativity, an emphasis is made (particularly in the preschool/kindergarten and early school years) to provide a creativity-friendly, rich, imagination-fostering environment for young children. Researchers have seen this as important because technology is advancing at an unprecedented rate and creative problem-solving will be needed to cope with these challenges as they arise. In addition to helping with problem solving, creativity also helps students identify problems where others have failed to do so. The Waldorf School is an example of an education program that promotes creative thought.

Promoting intrinsic motivation and problem solving are two areas where educators can foster creativity in students. Students are more creative when they see a task as intrinsically motivating, valued for its own sake. To promote creative thinking, educators need to identify what motivates their students and to structure teaching around it. Providing students with a choice of activities allows them to become more intrinsically motivated and therefore creative in completing the tasks.

Teaching students to solve problems that do not have well-defined answers is another way to foster their creativity. This is accomplished by allowing students to explore problems and redefine them, possibly drawing on knowledge that at first may seem unrelated to the problem in order to solve it. In adults, mentoring individuals is another way to foster their creativity. However, the benefits of mentoring creativity apply only to creative contributions considered great in a given field, not to everyday creative expression.

Musical creativity is a gateway to the flow state, which is conducive to spontaneity, improvisation, and creativity. Studies show that it is beneficial to emphasize students' creative side and integrate more creativity into their curriculums, with a notable strategy being through music. One reason for this is that students are able to express themselves through musical improvisation in a way that taps into higher order brain regions, while connecting with their peers and allowing them to go beyond typical pattern generation. In this sense, improvisation is a form of self-expression that can generate connectivity between peers and surpass the age-old rudimentary aspects of school.

==== Scotland ====
In the Scottish education system, creativity is identified as a core skillset for learning, life, and work, and is defined as "a process which generates ideas that have value to the individual. It involves looking at familiar things with a fresh eye, examining problems with an open mind, making connections, learning from mistakes, and using imagination to explore new possibilities." The need to develop a shared language and understanding of creativity and its role across every aspect of learning, teaching, and continuous improvement was identified as a necessary aim; and a set of four skills is used to allow educators to discuss and develop creativity across all subjects and sectors of education – curiosity, open-mindedness, imagination, and problem solving. Distinctions are made between creative learning (when learners are using their creativity skills), creative teaching (when educators are using their own creativity skills), and creative change (when creativity skills are applied to planning and improvement). Scotland's national Creative Learning Plan supports the development of creativity skills in all learners and of educators' expertise in developing creativity skills. A range of resources has been created to support and assess this, including a national review of creativity learning by Her Majesty's Inspectorate for Education.

==== China ====
China recognizes that creativity is crucial for national security, social development, and generally benefitting the people. Measures have been proposed to enhance creative ability in the country.

==== European Union ====
The European Union sees creativity as important for the development of basic skills, and has declared 2009 the Year of Creativity and Innovation. Countries such as France, Germany, Italy, and Spain have made the encouragement of creativity a part of their educational and economic policies.

== Organizational creativity ==
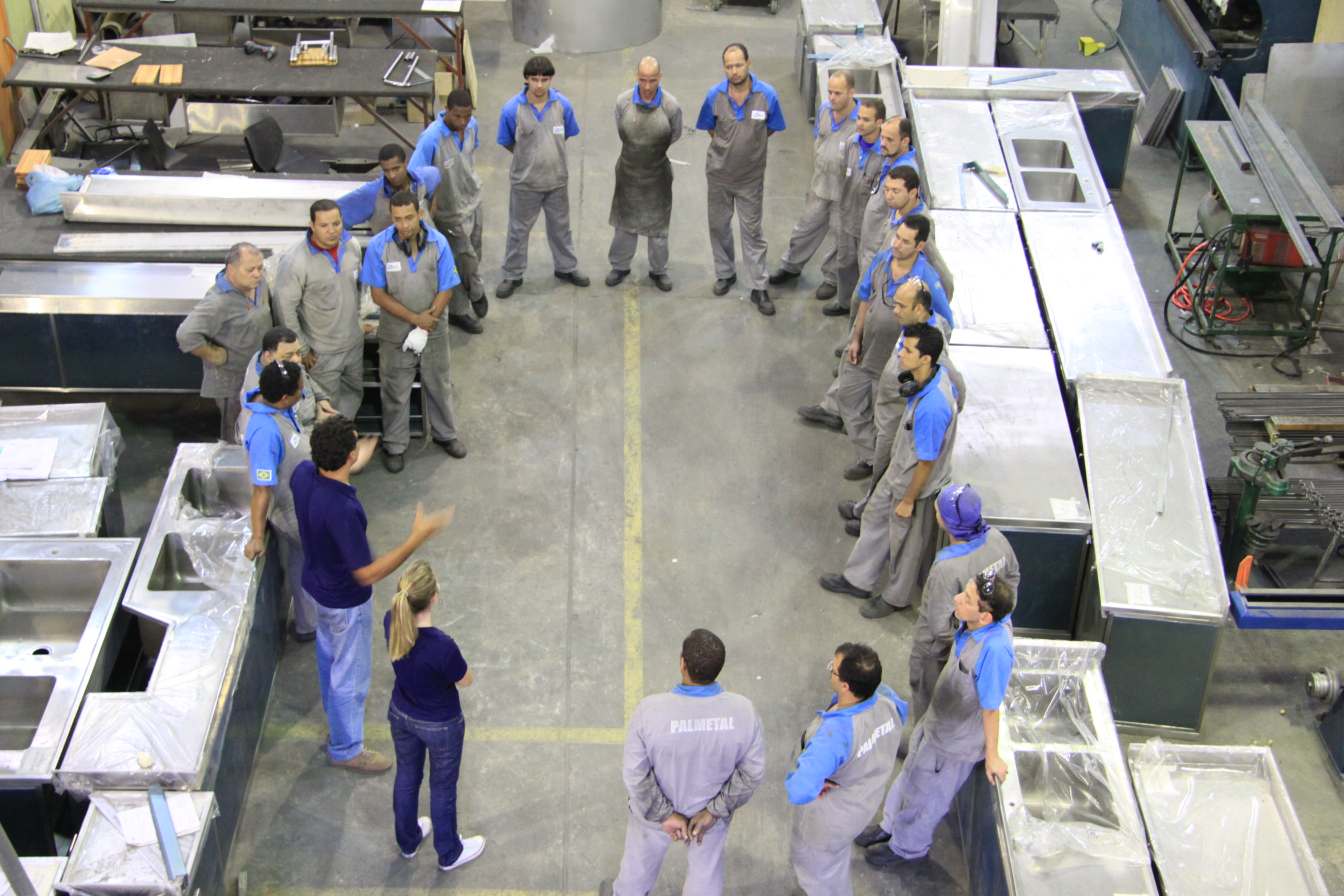
Training meeting in an eco-design stainless steel company in Brazil. The leaders, among other things, wish to cheer and encourage the workers in order to achieve a higher level of creativity.

Various research studies set out to establish that organizational effectiveness depends to a large extent on the creativity of the workforce. For any given organization, measures of effectiveness vary, depending upon the organization's mission, environmental context, nature of work, the product or service it produces, and customer demands. Thus, the first step in evaluating organizational effectiveness is to understand the organization itself – how it functions, how it is structured, and what it emphasizes.

Similarly, social psychologists, organizational scientists, and management scientists (who research factors that influence creativity and innovation in teams and organizations) have developed integrative theoretical models that emphasize the elements of team composition, team processes, and organizational culture. These theoretical models also emphasize the mutually reinforcing relationships between those elements in promoting innovation.

Research studies of the knowledge economy may be classified into three levels: macro, meso, and micro. Macro studies are at a societal or transnational level. Meso studies focus on organizations. Micro investigations center on the working of workers. There is also an interdisciplinary dimension when researching business, economics, education, human resource management, knowledge and organizational management, sociology, psychology, knowledge economy-related sectors – especially software, and advertising.

=== Organizational culture ===
Supportive and motivational environments that create psychological safety, encourage risk-taking, and tolerate mistakes increase team creativity. Organizations in which help-seeking, help-giving, and collaboration are rewarded promote innovation by providing opportunities and contexts in which team processes that lead to collective creativity can occur. Additionally, leadership styles that downplay hierarchies or power differences within an organization, and empower people to speak up about their ideas or opinions, also help to create cultures that are conducive to creativity.

=== Team composition ===
The diversity of team members' backgrounds and knowledge can increase team creativity by expanding the collection of unique information that is available to the team and by introducing different perspectives that can be integrated in novel ways. The Millennium Conferences on Creativity, a two-year-long Canadian review of the subject, for example, advocated for new linkages between the arts and science communities and targeted funding for multidisciplinary research. However, under some conditions, diversity can also decrease team creativity by making it more difficult for team members to communicate about ideas and causing interpersonal conflicts between those with different perspectives. Thus, the potential advantages of diversity must be supported by appropriate team processes and organizational cultures in order to enhance creativity.

=== Team processes ===
Team communication norms, such as respecting others' expertise, paying attention to others' ideas, expecting information sharing, tolerating disagreements, negotiating, remaining open to others' ideas, learning from others, and building on each other's ideas, increase team creativity by facilitating the social processes involved with brainstorming and problem solving. Through these processes, team members can access their collective pool of knowledge, reach shared understandings, identify new ways of understanding problems or tasks, and make new connections between ideas. Engaging in these social processes also promotes positive team affect, which facilitates collective creativity.

=== Constraints ===
There is a long-standing debate on how material constraints (e.g., lack of money, materials, or equipment) affect creativity. In psychological and managerial research, there are two competing views. In one view, scholars propose a negative effect of material constraints on innovation and claim that material constraints starve creativity. Proponents argue that adequate material resources are needed to engage in creative activities such as experimenting with new solutions and idea exploration. In an opposing view, scholars assert that people tend to stick to established routines or solutions as long as they are not forced to deviate from them by constraints. For example, material constraints facilitated the development of jet engines in World War II.

To reconcile these competing views, contingency models were proposed. The rationale behind these models is that certain contingency factors (e.g., creativity climate or creativity-relevant skills) influence the relationship between constraints and creativity. These contingency factors reflect the need for higher levels of motivation and skills when working on creative tasks under constraints. Depending on these contingency factors, there is either a positive or negative relationship between constraints and creativity.

== Fostering creativity ==
Several researchers have proposed methods of increasing a person's creativity. Such ideas range from the psychological-cognitive—such as the Osborn-Parnes Creative Problem Solving Process, Synectics, science-based creative thinking, Purdue Creative Thinking Program, and Edward de Bono's lateral thinking—to the highly structured—such as TRIZ (the Theory of Inventive Problem-Solving) and its variant Algorithm of Inventive Problem Solving (developed by the Russian scientist Genrich Altshuller), and Computer-Aided morphological analysis.

An empirical synthesis, of which methods work best in enhancing creativity, was published by Haase et al. Summarising the results of 84 studies, the authors found that complex training courses, meditation, and cultural exposure were most effective in enhancing creativity, while the use of cognitive-manipulation drugs was noneffective.

=== Need for closure ===
Experiments suggest the need for closure of task participants, whether as a reflection of personality or induced (through time pressure), negatively impacts creativity. Accordingly, it has been suggested that reading fiction, which can reduce the cognitive need for closure, may encourage creativity.

== Malevolent creativity ==
"Malevolent creativity" is the "dark side" of creativity. This type of creativity is not typically accepted within society and is defined by the intention to cause harm to others through original and innovative means. While it is often associated with criminal behavior, it can also be observed in ordinary day-to-day life as lying, cheating, and betrayal.

Malevolent creativity should be distinguished from negative creativity in that negative creativity may unintentionally cause harm to others, whereas malevolent creativity is malevolently motivated.

=== Crime ===
Malevolent creativity is a key contributor to crime and in its most destructive form can even manifest as terrorism. As creativity requires deviating from the conventional, there is permanent tension between being creative and going too far—in some cases to the point of breaking the law. Aggression is a key predictor of malevolent creativity, and increased levels of aggression correlate with a higher likelihood of committing crime.

=== Predictive factors ===
Although everyone shows some levels of malevolent creativity under certain conditions, those that have a higher propensity towards it have increased tendencies to deceive and manipulate others for their own gain. While malevolent creativity appears to dramatically increase when an individual is treated unfairly, personality, particularly aggressiveness, is also a key predictor in anticipating levels of malevolent thinking. Researchers Harris and Reiter-Palmon investigated the role of aggression in levels of malevolent creativity, in particular levels of implicit aggression and the tendency to employ aggressive actions in response to problem solving. The personality traits of physical aggression, conscientiousness, emotional intelligence, and implicit aggression all seem to be related with malevolent creativity. Harris and Reiter-Palmon's research showed that when subjects were presented with a problem that designed to trigger malevolent creativity, participants high in implicit aggression and low in premeditation expressed the largest number of malevolently themed solutions. When presented with the more benign problem designed to trigger prosocial motives of helping others and cooperating, those high in implicit aggression, even if they tended to be highly impulsive, were far less destructive in their imagined solutions. The researchers concluded premeditation, more than implicit aggression, controlled an individual's expression of malevolent creativity.

The current measure for malevolent creativity is the 13-item Malevolent Creativity Behaviour Scale (MCBS).

== Academic journals ==
- Creativity Research Journal
- International Journal of Creative Computing
- Journal of Creative Behavior
- Psychology of Aesthetics, Creativity, and the Arts
- Thinking Skills and Creativity

== See also ==
- Adaptive performance
- Artistic inspiration
- Brainstorming
- Computational creativity
- Confabulation (neural networks)
- Content creation
- Creative age
- Creativity techniques
- Daydreaming
- Dreaming
- E-scape
- Fantasy prone personality
- Genius
- Guided visualization
- Heroic theory of invention and scientific development
- History of the concept of creativity
- Imagination
- Innovation
- Invention (such as "artistic invention" in the visual arts)
- Lateral thinking
- Learned industriousness
- Multiple discovery
- Music therapy
- Musical improvisation
- Openness to experience
- Originality
- Maciej Kazimierz Sarbiewski (1595–1640), Polish poet and theoretician of poetry, who first applied the word "creation" to a human activity (poetry).
- Why Man Creates (film)
