= Robert Hecht-Nielsen =

American computer scientist (1947–2019)

- Born: July 18, 1947; San Francisco, California, US
- Died: May 25, 2019 (aged 71); Del Mar, California, US
- Education: Arizona State University
- Known for: Artificial Neural Networks, Confabulation Theory, HNC Inc.
- Awards: INNS Gabor Award, IEEE Neural Networks Pioneer Award, IEEE Fellow
- Scientific career
- Fields: Artificial Neural Network
- Workplaces: Motorola; TRW Inc. University of California, San Diego
- Thesis: Transport operators (1974)

Robert Hecht-Nielsen (July 18, 1947 – May 25, 2019) was an American computer scientist, neuroscientist, entrepreneur and professor of electrical and computer engineering at the University of California, San Diego. He co-founded HNC Software Inc. (NASDAQ: HNCS) in 1986 which went on to develop the pervasive card fraud detection system, Falcon®. He became a vice president of R&D at Fair Isaac Corporation when it acquired the company in 2002.

== Education and career ==
Hecht-Nielsen was born in San Francisco, California to a Danish immigrant father and an American mother. His family moved to Denver, Colorado when he was eight until his college years. Hecht-Nielsen studied at University of Colorado Denver before moving to Arizona State University, where he completed his bachelor's degree in mathematics with a minor in anthropology in 1971 and his doctoral degree in mathematics in 1974 with a thesis topic on functional analysis. He worked at Motorola from 1979 to 1983, and at TRW from 1983 to 1986. In 1985, he became an adjunct professor of electrical engineering at University of California, San Diego. In 1986, Hecht-Nielsen and his business partner Todd Gutschow founded HNC Software Inc.

== Research ==
=== Artificial Neural Networks ===
As a pioneer in the field of artificial neural networks, he authored the first textbook on the subject, Neurocomputing, in 1989. Hecht-Nielsen was awarded the INNS Gabor Award and INNS Neural Networks Pioneer Award for his significant contributions to the field. He was among the core group of researchers who proved that neural networks are universal function approximators.

=== Confabulation Theory ===
In March, 2005, he held an event to announce "the fundamental mechanism of cognition" dubbed Confabulation Theory, which he believes is a process of confabulation. He posits that all actions and thoughts begin as the "winners" of competitions, where confabulations are tested for cogency based on antecedent support. He presented some mathematical models of the proposed mechanism, and some experimental results where software using this system was able to add several words to a stub of a sentence, keeping that stub coherent and, optionally, maintaining some connection to a full input sentence supplied as context.

For example, given "But the other ..." the program returns "But the other semifinal match between fourth-seeded ...". Given "Japan manufactures many consumer products." for context, and the same three-word stub, it returns "But the other executives included well-known companies ...". Five pages of such examples were given.

He made red, green, and blue-striped medallions to commemorate the event, and had them distributed to the audience along with pamphlets explaining their significance: "This new era, which as yet has no name, will be characterized by the eternal universal freedom from want provided by intelligent machines."
