= Incubation (psychology) =

Unconscious processing of problems

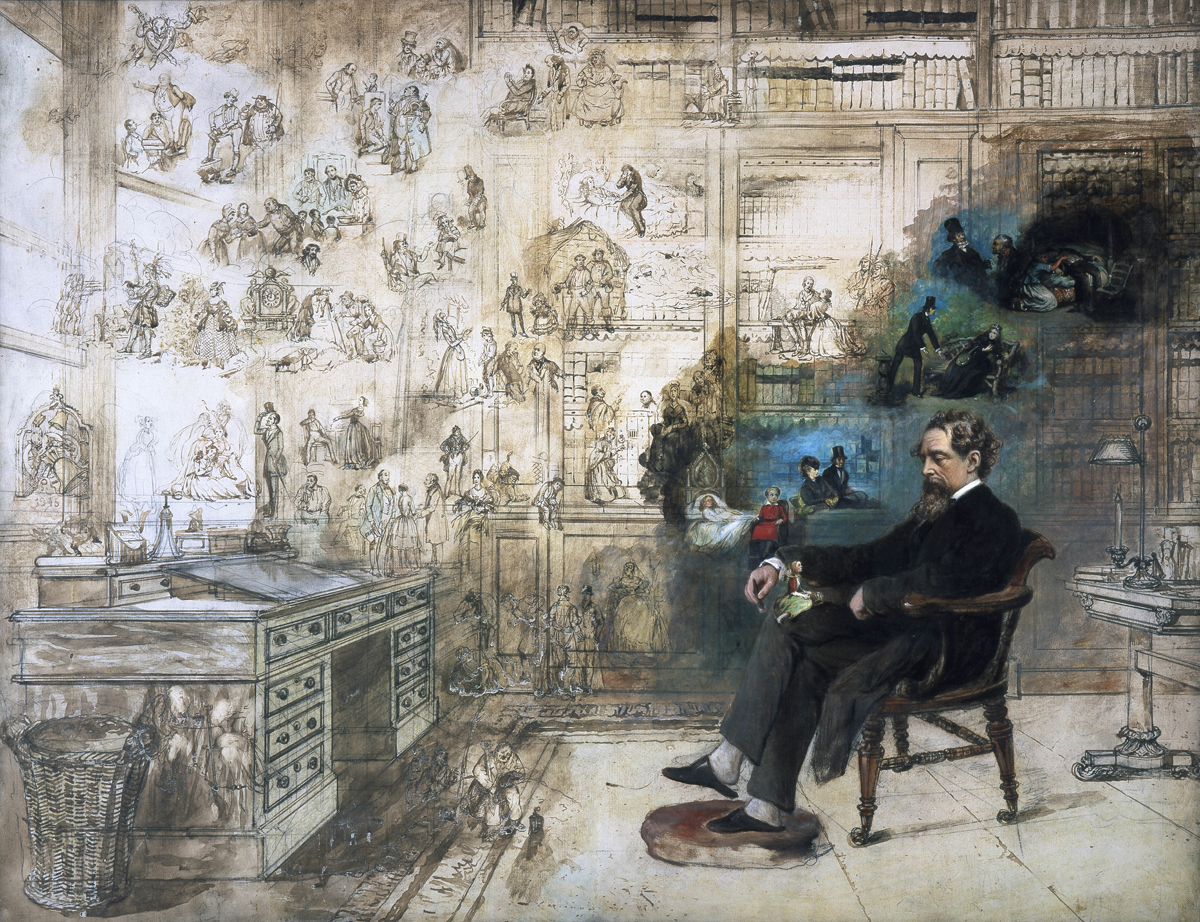
"Dickens' Dream", unfinished painting by Robert W. Buss (1804-1875)

In psychology, incubation refers to the unconscious processing of problems, when they are set aside for a period of time, that may lead to insights. It was originally proposed by Graham Wallas in 1926 as one of his four stages of the creative process: preparation, incubation, illumination, and verification. Incubation is related to intuition and insight in that it is the unconscious part of a process whereby an intuition may become validated as an insight. Incubation substantially increases the odds of solving a problem, and benefits from long incubation periods with low cognitive workloads.

The experience of leaving a problem for a period of time and then finding that the difficulty evaporates on returning to the problem, or, even more striking, that the solution "comes out of the blue" when thinking about something else, is widespread. Many guides to effective thinking and problem solving advise the reader to set problems aside for a time.

== Paradigm for investigation ==
The most widely adopted paradigm for investigating incubation involves comparing problems on which participants take a break during solving with problems on which participants work for a continuous period. The total time spent on each problem is equated across the conditions, and the incubation period is usually filled with unrelated activity to prevent further conscious work on the problem. Superior performance on problems for which work is split over two sessions is taken as evidence for the incubation effect, which is thus operationally defined as any benefit of a break during problem solving.

== Effects of emotion and sleep ==
When discussing the relation between incubation effect, emotions, and creativity, researchers found that positive mood enhances creativity at work. That means that a given day's creativity would be expected to follow reliably from the previous day's mood, above and beyond any carry-over of that previous day's mood. Theory and research on incubation, long recognized as a part of the creative process, suggest such cross-day effects. Thus, if positive mood on a particular day increases the number and scope of available thoughts, those additional thoughts may incubate overnight, increasing the probability of creative thoughts the following day.

Recent advances in neuroscience provide intriguing evidence of the mechanisms underlying incubation effects, particularly those that occur during sleep. This research reveals that people's experiences while awake can be consolidated into memory and result in enhanced performance the next day without any additional practice or engagement in the task. Moreover, there is mounting evidence that sleep can facilitate the types of memory and learning processes, such as associative memory, that contribute to creative problem solving. In one relevant experiment, researchers demonstrated that problem-solving insight can be dramatically enhanced by a period of sleep following initial work on a problem.

== Effects of dreams ==
In the 1970s, Stanford Sleep Lab Director William Dement gave 500 undergraduate students three "brain-teaser" problems to read over before going to sleep and had them note whether they had solutions in their dreams that night; seven students had a dream containing the solution. In 1993, Harvard psychologist Deirdre Barrett conducted research asking college students to incubate answers to real-life homework and other objective problems on which they were working, finding that, in one week's time, half had dreamed about their topic and a quarter had a dream which provided an answer. Barrett also interviewed modern artists and scientists about their use of their dreams, documenting dramatic anecdotes including winners of Nobel Prizes and MacArthur "Genius Grants" whose ideas originated in dreams. Her research concludes that, while anything—math, musical composition, business dilemmas—may get solved during dreaming, the two areas dreams are especially likely to help are 1) anything where vivid visualization contributes to the solution, whether in artistic design or invention of 3-D technological devices and 2) any problem where the solution lies in thinking outside the box—i.e. where the person is stuck because the conventional wisdom on how to approach the problem is wrong.

Not everybody agrees about the usefulness of dreams in solving problems. In the August 2004 article "Dreams: The Case Against Problem-Solving", G. William Domhoff concluded:

When all is said and done, there is only occasional anecdotal evidence for the idea that recalled dreams have any role in solving or detecting problems. This evidence is not impressive when it is arrayed against the small percentage of dreams that are recalled and the even smaller percentage of recalled dreams that might be construed as having a solution to a problem. Dreams may on occasion be useful to waking consciousness as a basis for thinking about problems in a new way, or as a basis for discussing personal problems, as some clinical research shows (Fiss, 1991; Greenberg et al., 1992). And dreams that have a dramatic emotional impact create a strong subjective sense that they must have a useful message. However, it does not follow from clinical usefulness or a waking impression of importance that dreaming has an adaptive function (Antrobus, 1993).

== See also ==
- Broaden-and-build
- Emotion and memory
