= Creative professional =

A creative professional who is also known as a creative specialist is a person who is employed for the extraction of skills in creative endeavors. Creative professions include writing, art, design, theater, television, radio, motion pictures, related crafts, as well as marketing, strategy, scientific research and development, product development, engineering, some types of teaching and curriculum design, and more. Since many creative professionals (actors and writers, for example) are also employed in secondary professions, estimates of creative professionals are often inaccurate. By some estimates, approximately 10 million US workers are creative professionals; depending upon the depth and breadth of the definition, this estimate may be doubled.

== History ==
Although creative professionals have been a part of the workforce for more than 500 years, several events during the past decade have altered industry and public perception of these workers.

The change in status began in the late 1990s when demand for creative workers was high due to the internet boom. Creative workers found that their talents in graphic and interactive design were valuable, and so, the workers began to develop independent cultures in select cities throughout the world, notably San Francisco, New York City and Boston. Some smaller cities, such as Austin and Portland also became centers where creative people found abundant opportunity. This trend has been documented in author Richard Florida's book, The Creative Class.

As the creative workforce has evolved in the post-dot.com era, creative workers have continued to flourish. Daniel H. Pink's book A Whole New Mind describes the transition in American business from Information Age to conceptual age. Pink describes information-era jobs as expendable and exportable, and offers that the MFA may yield more value for newer American workers than the MBA might generate in today's economy.

The Creative Professional, by Howard Blumenthal, describes the phenomenon from yet another perspective: that of the individual worker now emerging as a serious business professional with specific skills on par with lawyers, accountants, doctors, and other workers who are perceived to be within a special class. The book describes the unique business and career issues for the individual creative worker.

== Expansion of scope and study ==
To date, most of the information about this growing phenomenon exists in book form. Many of the ideas and mechanisms are related to changes in copyright law, as described by Lawrence Lessig and Creative Commons.

University education for creative professionals is often presented under older definitions of music, art, and related disciplines, but the processes related to creative thought, particularly as they apply to work, are found in books about cognitive psychology. Author and cognitive thinking researcher Howard Gardner has defined a variety of intelligences related to creative workers. Psychologist Mihaly Csikszentmihalyi has described the process of creative work effectively in several books, including Flow: The Psychology of Optimal Experience. Professors in Business have also started to explore the success factors for creative professionals including Harvard Business School Professor Teresa Amabile who has studied and published research on creative professionals like author John Irving among others.

Corporate research and the development of products and services specifically for creative professionals has started to crop up as companies hire increasing numbers of creative professionals to compete on innovation. Recent changes to corporate slogans are indicative of the trend. In 2003, GE's slogan changed from "We Bring Good Things To Life" to "Imagination at Work" and Hewlett Packard adopted the slogan "Invent."

== Bibliography ==
- The Whole Mac: Solutions for the Creative Professional. ISBN 978-1-568-30298-0.
