= History of the concept of creativity =

The ways in which societies have perceived the concept of creativity have changed throughout history, as has the term itself. The ancient Greek concept of art (in Greek, "techne"—the root of "technique" and "technology") -with the exception of poetry- involved not freedom of action, but subjection to rules. In Rome, the Greek concept was partly shaken, and visual artists were viewed as sharing, with poets, imagination and inspiration.

Under medieval Christianity, the Latin "creatio" came to designate God's act of "creatio ex nihilo" ("creation from nothing"); thus "creatio" ceased to apply to human activities. The Middle Ages, however, went even further than antiquity, when they revoked poetry's exceptional status: it, too, was an art, and therefore craft- not creativity.

Renaissance men sought to voice their sense of their freedom and creativity. The first to apply the word "creativity", however, was the 17th-century Polish poet Maciej Kazimierz Sarbiewski—but he applied it only to poetry. For over a century and a half, the idea of human creativity met with resistance, because the term "creation" was reserved for creation "from nothing".

Nineteenth century religious skepticism allowed for a change in definition: now not only was art recognized as creativity, but it alone was. And at the turn of the 20th century, when there began to be discussion as well of creativity in the sciences and in nature, this was taken as the transference, to the sciences and to nature, of concepts that were proper to art.

The 21st century introduced a further development in the understanding of creativity. It has become recognized as an economic resource in professional industries. The introduction of artificial intelligence though has raised questions about the validity of creativity, if human intention is necessary anymore. It has also raised concerns regarding the effect of artificial influence on creative thinking in humans.

== Term and concept ==
=== Ancient Greece ===
The ancient Greeks had no terms corresponding to "to create" or "creator." The expression "poiein" ("to make") was applied specifically to poiesis (poetry) and to the poietes (poet, or "maker") who made it rather than to art in general in its modern understanding. For example, Plato asks in The Republic, "Will we say, of a painter, that he makes something?" and answers, "Certainly not, he merely imitates." To the ancient Greeks, the concept of a creator and of creativity implied freedom of action, whereas the Greeks' concept of art involved subjection to laws and rules. Art (in Greek, "techne") was "the making of things, according to rules." It contained no creativity, and it would have been—in the Greeks' view—a bad state of affairs if it had.

This understanding of art had a distinct premise: Nature is perfect and is subject to laws, therefore man ought to discover its laws and submit to them, and not seek freedom, which will deflect him from that optimum which he can attain. The artist was a discoverer, not an inventor.

The sole exception to this Greek view—a great exception—was poetry. The poet made new things—brought to life a new world—while the artist merely imitated. And the poet, unlike the artist, was not bound by laws. There were no terms corresponding to "creativity" or "creator," but in reality the poet was understood to be one who creates. And only he was so understood. In music, there was no freedom: melodies were prescribed, particularly for ceremonies and entertainments, and were known tellingly as "nomoi" ("laws"). In the visual arts, freedom was limited by the proportions that Polyclitus had established for the human frame, and which he called "the canon" (meaning, "measure"). Plato argued in Timaeus that, to execute a good work, one must contemplate an eternal model. Later the Roman, Cicero, would write that art embraces those things "of which we have knowledge" ("quae sciuntur").

Poets saw things differently. Book I of the Odyssey asks, "Why forbid the singer to please us with singing as he himself will?" Aristotle had doubts as to whether poetry was imitation of reality, and as to whether it required adherence to truth: it was, rather, the realm of that "which is neither true nor false."

=== Ancient Rome and medieval period ===
In the Roman era, these Greek concepts were partly challenged. Horace wrote that not only poets but painters as well were entitled to the privilege of daring whatever they wished to ("quod libet audendi"). In the declining period of antiquity, Philostratus wrote that "one can discover a similarity between poetry and art and find that they have imagination in common." Callistratos averred that "Not only is the art of the poets and prosaists inspired, but likewise the hands of sculptors are gifted with the blessing of divine inspiration." This was something new: classical Greeks had not applied the concepts of imagination and inspiration to the visual arts but had restricted them to poetry. Latin was richer than Greek: it had a term for "creating" ("creatio") and for "creator," and had two expressions—"facere" and "creare"—where Greek had but one, "poiein." Still, the two Latin terms meant much the same thing.

A fundamental change, however, came in the Christian period: "creatio" came to designate God's act of "creation from nothing" ("creatio ex nihilo"). "Creatio" thus took on a different meaning than "facere" ("to make"), and ceased to apply to human functions. As the 6th-century Roman official and literary figure Cassiodorus wrote, "things made and created differ, for we can make, who cannot create."

Alongside this new, religious interpretation of the expression, there persisted the ancient view that art is not a domain of creativity. This is seen in two early and influential Christian writers, Pseudo-Dionysius and St. Augustine. Later, medieval men (such as Hraban the Moor and Robert Grosseteste in the 13th century) thought much the same way. The Middle Ages here went even further than antiquity; they made no exception of poetry: it too had its rules, was an art, and was therefore craft and not creativity.

=== Renaissance ===
The Renaissance saw a change in perspective. The philosopher Marsilio Ficino wrote that the artist "thinks up" ("excogitatio") his works; the theoretician of architecture and painting, Leon Battista Alberti, that he "preordains" ("preordinazione"); Raphael, that he shapes a painting according to his idea; Leonardo da Vinci, that he employs "shapes that do not exist in nature"; Michelangelo, that the artist realizes his vision rather than imitating nature; Giorgio Vasari, that "nature is conquered by art"; the Venetian art theoretician, Paolo Pino, that painting is "inventing what is not"; Paolo Veronese, that painters avail themselves of the same liberties as do poets and madmen; Federico Zuccari (1542–1609), that the artist shapes "a new world, new paradises"; Cesare Cesariano (1483–1541), that architects are "demi-gods." Among musicians, the Flemish composer and musicologist Johannes Tinctoris (1446–1511) demanded novelty in what a composer did, and defined a composer as "one who produces new songs."

Still more emphatic were those who wrote about poetry: G.P. Capriano held (1555) that the poet's invention springs "from nothing." Francesco Patrizi (1586) saw poetry as "fiction," "shaping," "transformation."

=== 1600s ===
The first to apply the word "creation" to a human activity (poetry) was the 17th-century Polish poet and theoretician of poetry, Maciej Kazimierz Sarbiewski (1595–1640), known as "the last Latin poet." In his treatise, De perfecta poesi, he not only wrote that a poet "invents," "after a fashion builds," but also that the poet "creates anew" ("de novo creat"). Sarbiewski even added: "in the manner of God" ("instar Dei").

Sarbiewski, however, regarded creativity as the exclusive privilege of poetry; creativity was not open to visual artists. "Other arts merely imitate and copy but do not create, because they assume the existence of the material from which they create or of the subject." As late as the end of the 17th century, André Félibien (1619–75) would write that the painter is "so to speak [a] creator." The Spanish Jesuit Baltasar Gracián (1601–58) wrote similarly as Sarbiewski: "Art is the completion of nature, as it were a second Creator..."

=== 1700s ===
By the 18th century, the concept of creativity was appearing more often in art theory. It was linked with the concept of imagination, which was on all lips. Joseph Addison wrote that the imagination "has something in it like creation." Voltaire declared (1740) that "the true poet is creative." With both these authors, however, this was rather only a comparison of poet with creator.

Other writers took a different view. Denis Diderot felt that imagination is merely "the memory of forms and contents," and "creates nothing" but only combines, magnifies or diminishes. It was precisely in 18th-century France, indeed, that the idea of man's creativity met with resistance. Charles Batteux wrote that "The human mind cannot create, strictly speaking; all its products bear the stigmata of their model; even monsters invented by an imagination unhampered by laws can only be composed of parts taken from nature." Luc de Clapiers, marquis de Vauvenargues (1715–47), and Étienne Bonnot de Condillac (1715–80) spoke to a similar effect.

Their resistance to the idea of human creativity had a triple source. First of all, the expression, "creation," was then reserved for creation ex nihilo (Latin: from nothing), which was inaccessible to man. Secondly, creation is a mysterious act, and Enlightenment psychology did not admit of mysteries. Lastly, artists of the age were attached to their rules, and creativity seemed irreconcilable with rules. The latter objection was the weakest, as it was already beginning to be realized (e.g., by Houdar de la Motte, 1715) that rules ultimately are a human invention.

=== 1800s-1900s ===
In the 19th century, art took its compensation for the resistance of preceding centuries against recognizing it as creativity. Now, not only was art regarded as creativity, but it alone was.

The art critic John Ruskin has often been referred to in the context of the transition to self-expression in the history of art education, though some scholars believe this to be a misreading.

At the turn of the 20th century, when there began to be discussion as well of creativity in the sciences (e.g., Jan Łukasiewicz, 1878–1956) and in nature (e.g., Henri Bergson), this was generally taken as the transference, to the sciences and to nature, of concepts proper to art.

The start of the scientific study of creativity is sometimes taken as J. P. Guilford's 1950 address to the American Psychological Association, which helped popularize the subject.

=== 2000s ===
In the 21st century, digital technology continued its advancement creating new opportunities for creative expression and collaboration. Creativity has become recognized as an economic resource, mostly within industries involving media and entertainment. This shift contributed to discussions beyond the usage of creativity for traditional artistic settings, including professional environments.

As artificial intelligence has developed, researchers have explored the question of whether computers could demonstrate creativity in a traditional way like humans. Due to this, questions have been raised about originality, authorship, and the necessity of humanity behind creativity. The historical relationship between artificial intelligence and creativity was examined by Caterina Moruzzi, who described how technological advancements influenced changing perspectives on the chance of machine creativity.

By the 2020s, the continuation of the development of artificial intelligence and LLMs introduced new possibilities between human and computer creativity. Hye-Kyung Lee discussed how artificial intelligence challenges the understanding of human agency and creative labor, while also taking into account how technological tools can make creative expression more accessible. Research done by Kumar et al. (2025) takes this research further by performing experiments on the effects of LLMs on human creative thought. Their findings concluded that artificial assistance had the chance of increasing performance but when taken away, negatively impacted the participants' independent creative performances.

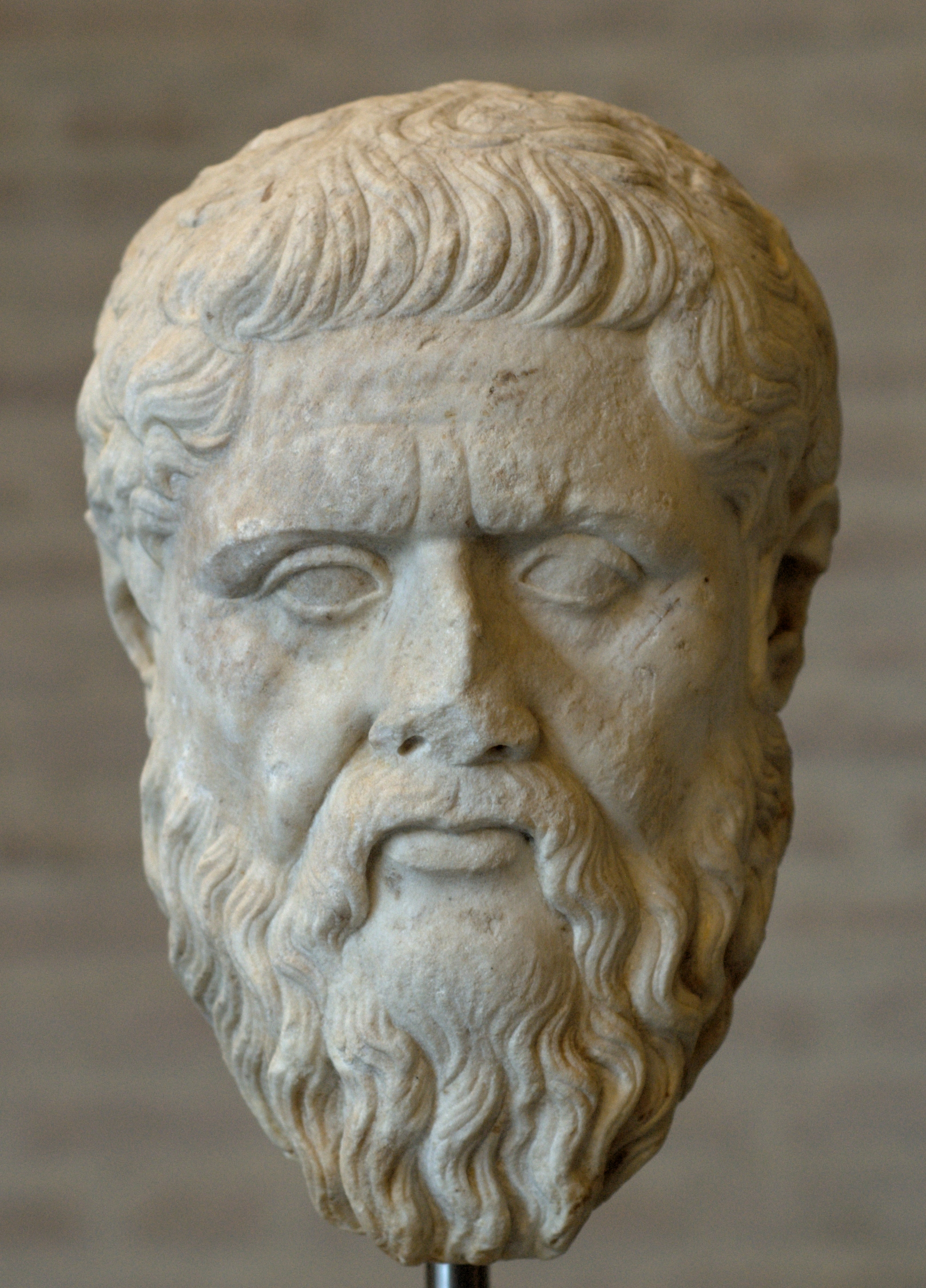
Plato

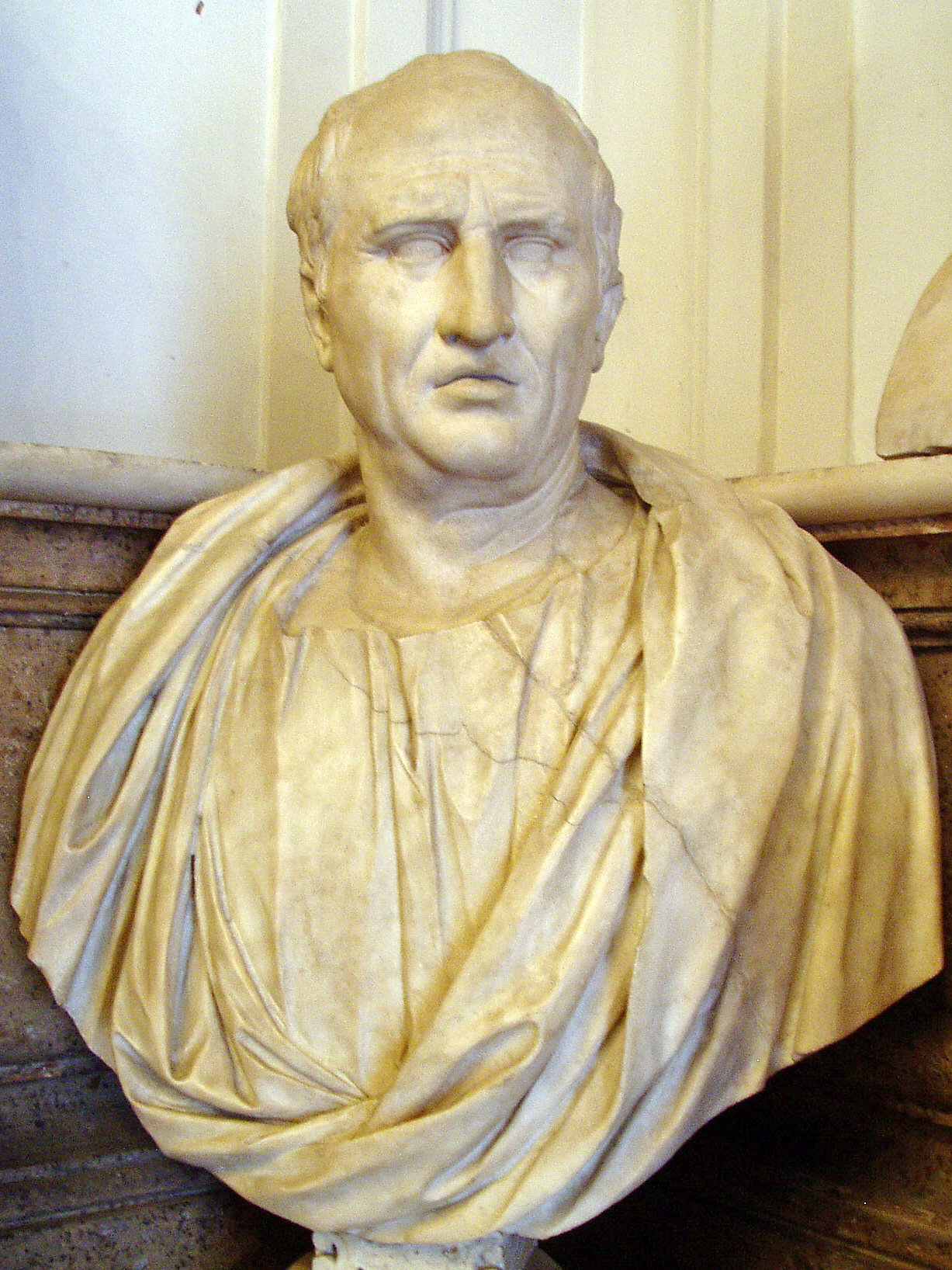
Cicero

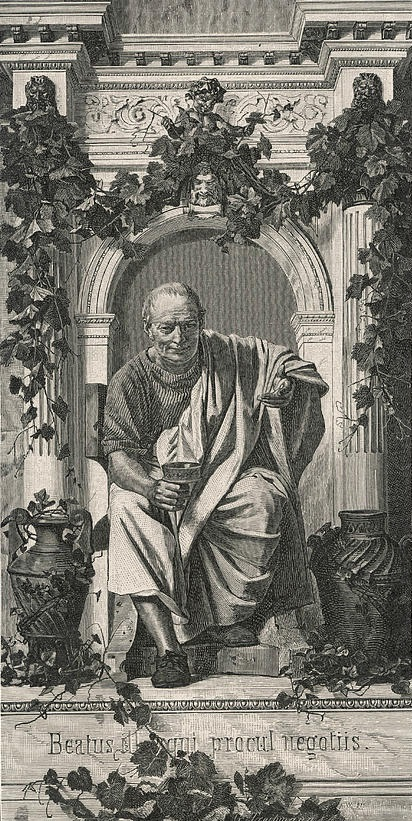
Horace

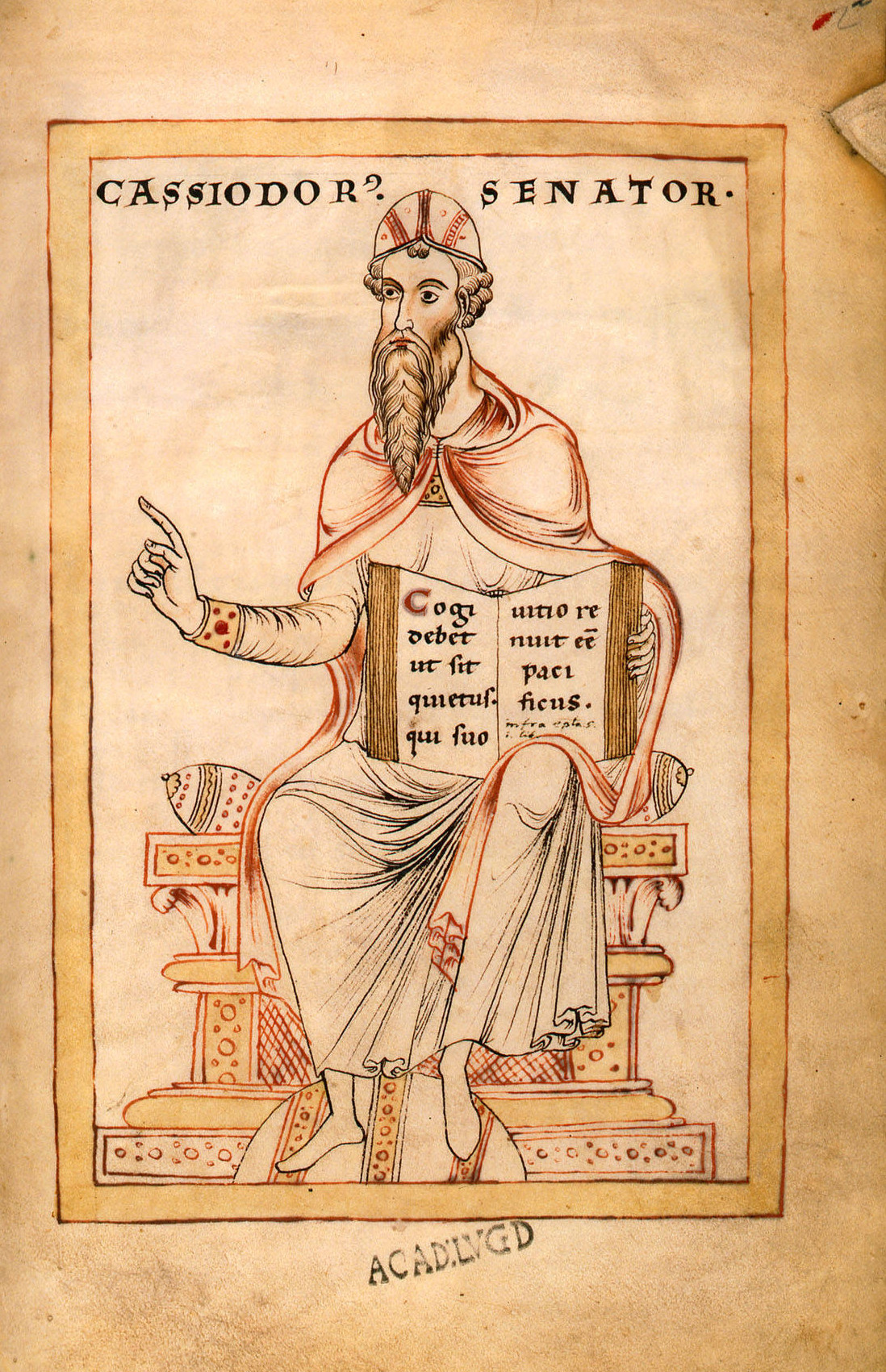
Cassiodorus

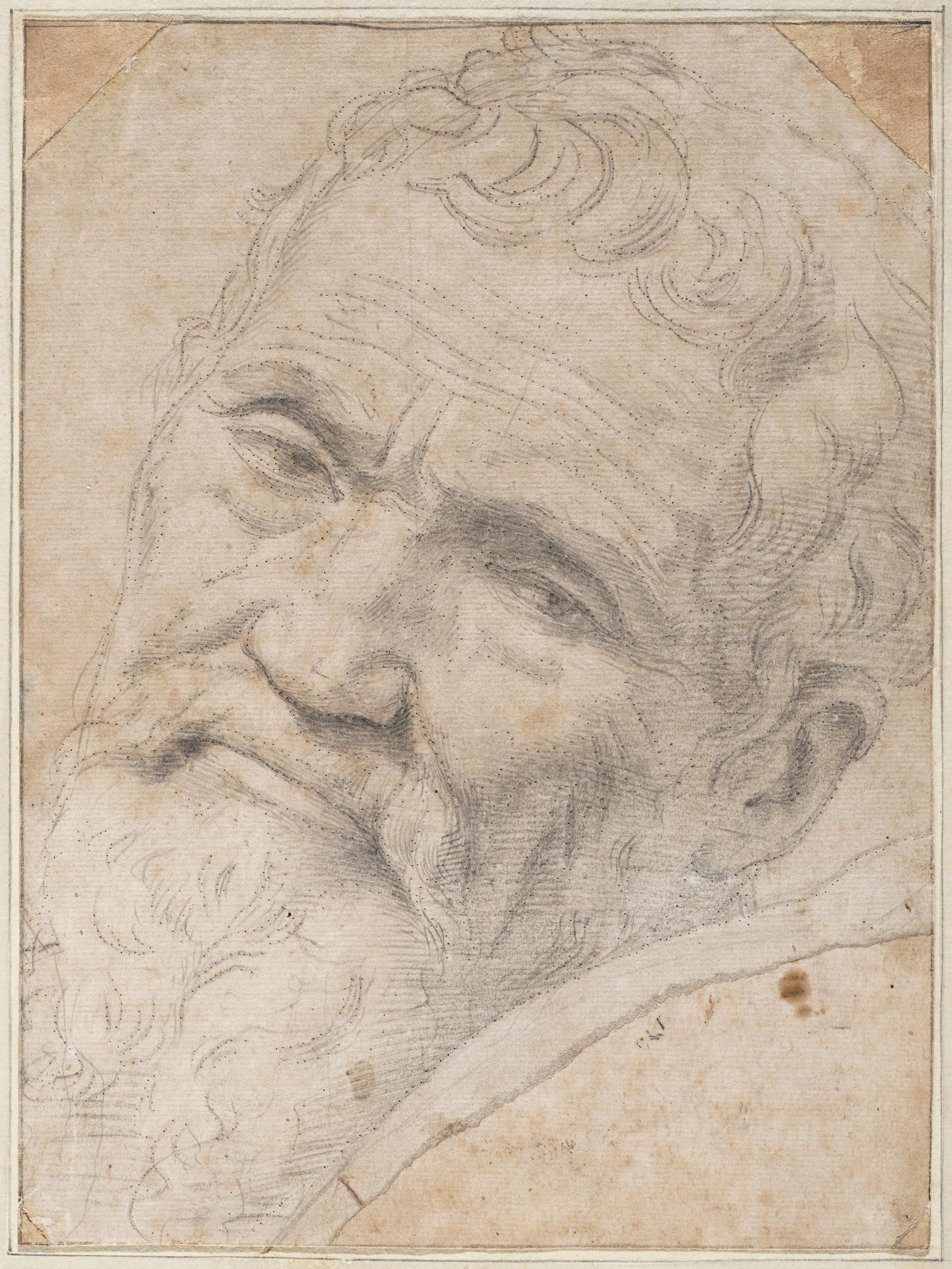
Michelangelo

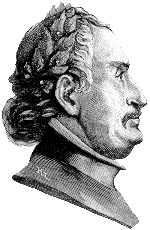
Sarbiewski

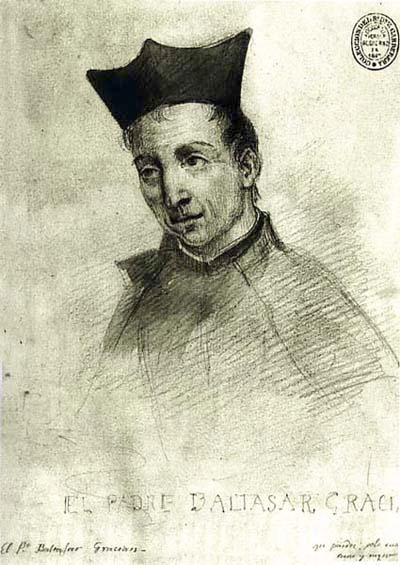
Gracián

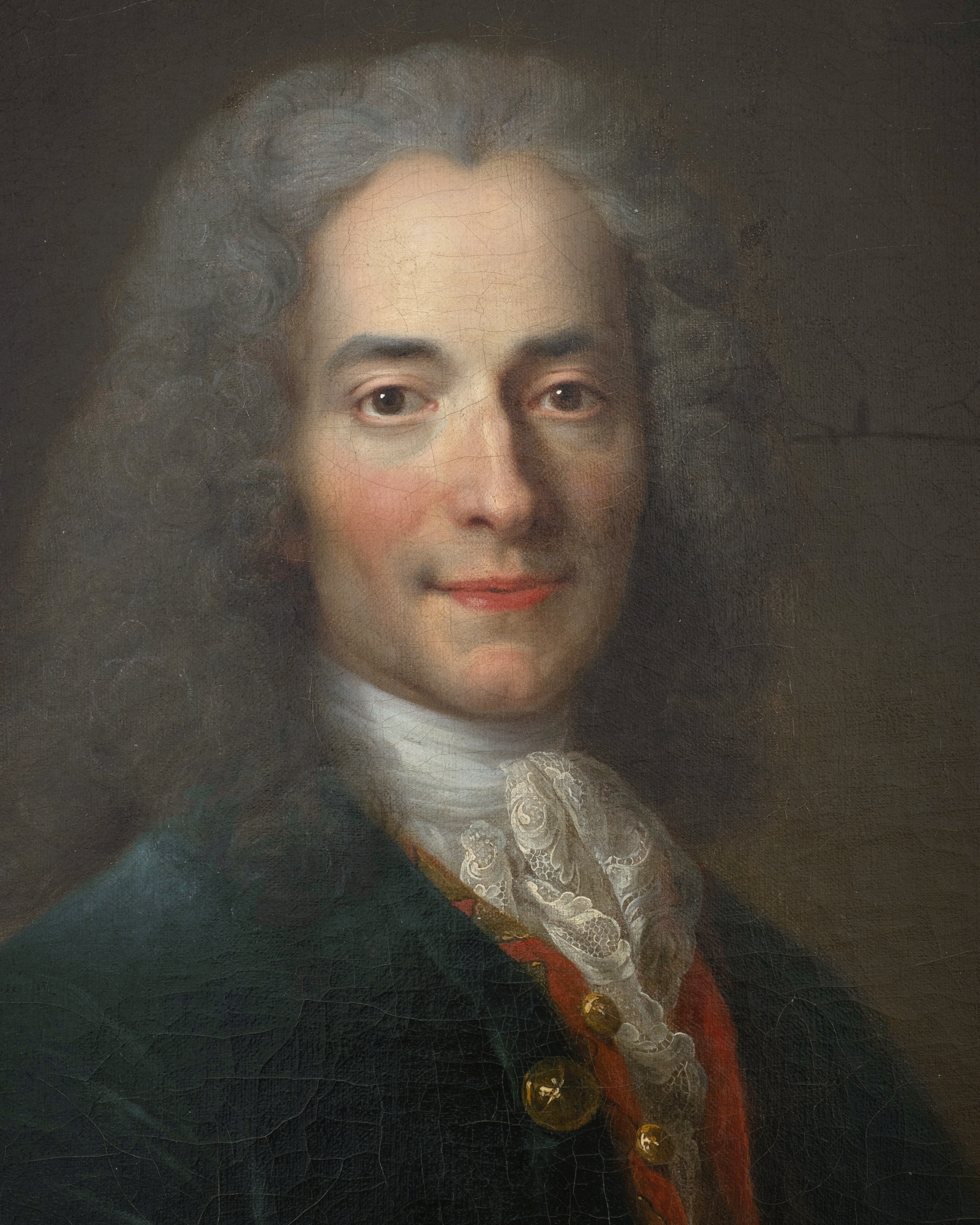
Voltaire

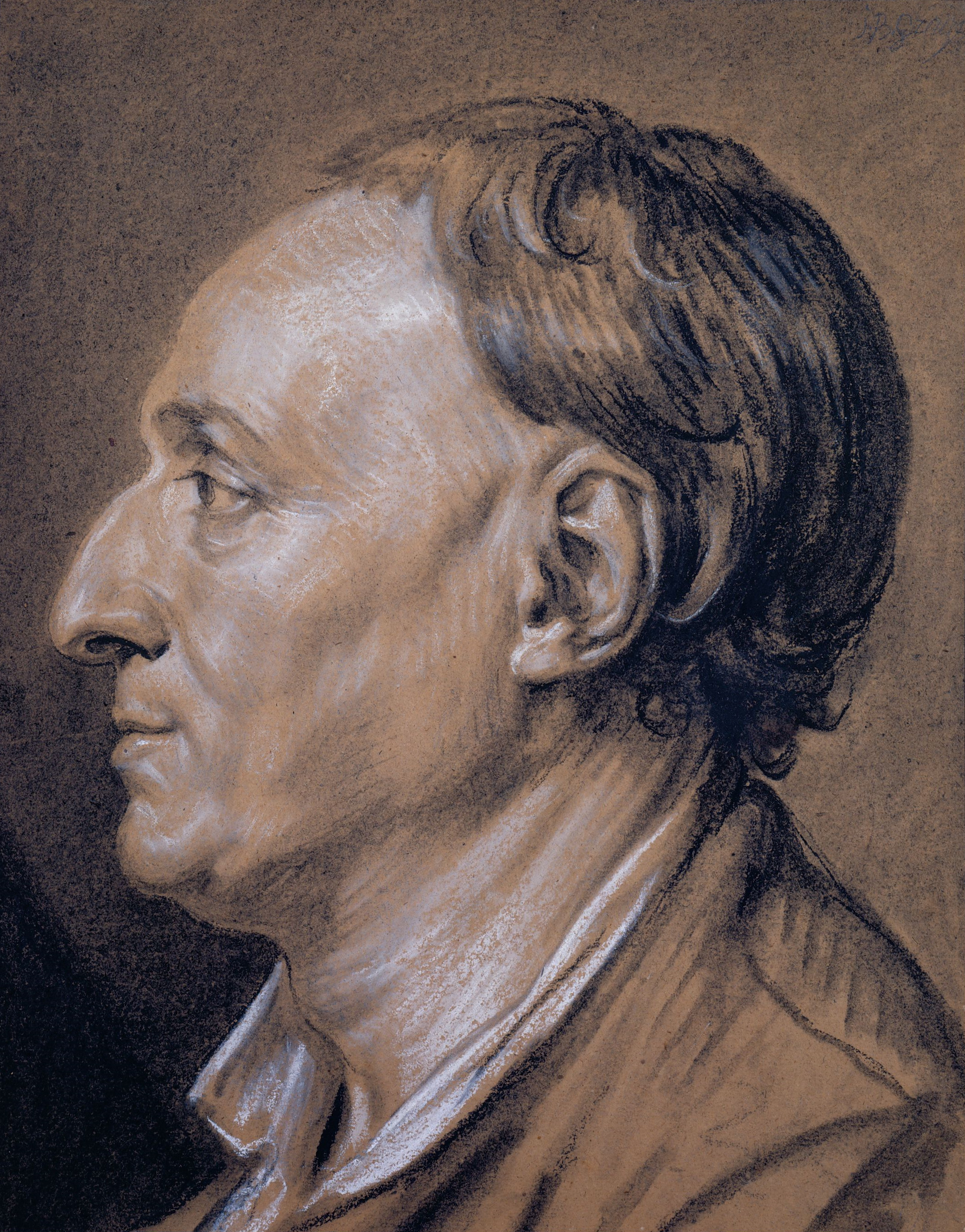
Diderot

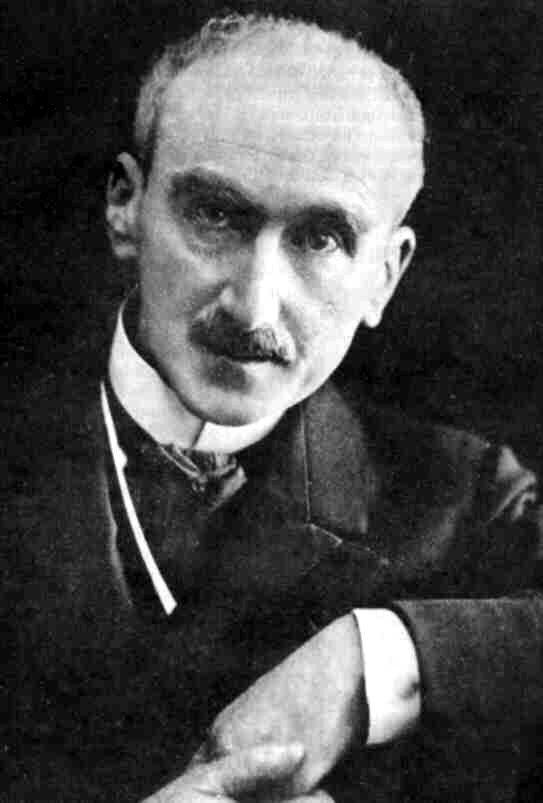
Bergson

== See also ==
- Multiple discovery § Mechanism

== General and cited references ==
- Lehrer, Jonah (2012). Imagine: How Creativity Works. Grand Haven, MI: Brilliance Audio. ISBN 9781441864451. OCLC 1230269967.
- Sternberg, R. J., ed. (1999). Handbook of Creativity. Cambridge: Cambridge University Press. ISBN 9780521572859. OCLC 39605774.
  - Albert, R. S.; Runco, M.A. (1999). "A History of Research on Creativity". In Sternberg, R. J. (ed.). Handbook of Creativity. Cambridge: Cambridge University Press. ISBN 9780521572859. OCLC 39605774.
  - Sternberg, R. J.; Lubart, T.I. (1999). "The Concept of Creativity: Prospects and Paradigms". In Sternberg, R. J. (ed.). Handbook of Creativity. Cambridge: Cambridge University Press. ISBN 9780521572859. OCLC 39605774.
- Tatarkiewicz, Władysław (1980). A History of Six Ideas: An Essay in Aesthetics. Translated by Christopher Kasparek (from the Polish). The Hague: Martinus Nijhoff. ISBN 9789024722334. OCLC 5171592. The book traces the history of key aesthetics concepts, including art, beauty, form, creativity, mimesis, and the aesthetic experience.
- Weber, Michel (2006). "Creativity, Efficacy and Vision: Ethics and Psychology in an Open Universe". In Michel Weber; Pierfrancesco Basile (eds.). Subjectivity, Process, and Rationality. Process Thought XIV. Frankfurt; Piscataway, N.J.: Ontos Verlag; Transaction Books, Rutgers University. pp. 263–281. ISBN 9783938793381. OCLC 77482359.
