= Liane Gabora =

Canadian psychologist

Liane Gabora is a professor of psychology at the University of British Columbia - Okanagan. She is known for her theory of the "Origin of the modern mind through conceptual closure," which built on her earlier work on "Autocatalytic closure in a cognitive system: A tentative scenario for the origin of culture."

== Career ==
Gabora has contributed to the study of cultural evolution and evolution of societies, focusing on the role of personal creativity, as opposed to memetic imitation or instruction, in differentiating modern human from prior hominid or modern ape culture. In particular, she seems to follow feminist economists and green economists in making a distinction between creative "enterprise", invention, art or "individual capital" and imitative "meme", rule, social category or "instructional capital".

Gabora's views contrasts with that of memetics and of the strongest social capital theorists (e.g. Karl Marx or Paul Adler) in that she seems to see social signals or labels as markers of trust invested in individual and instructional complexes, rather than as first class actors in themselves.

Some of her more recent work is controversial in the philosophy of science and goes against the particle physics foundation ontology.

"Honing Theory: A Complex Systems Framework for Creativity" is her publication, which suggests that culture evolves through social interaction and exchange between minds that self-organise and modify based on their environment.

== Works ==
- Gabora, L. (1997) The origin and evolution of culture and creativity. Journal of Memetics: Evolutionary Models of Information Transmission, 1(1).
- Gabora, L. (1995) Meme and variations: A computer model of cultural evolution. In (L. Nadel & D. Stein, Eds.) 1993 Lectures in Complex Systems. Addison-Wesley.
- Gabora, L. & Aerts, D. (2002) Contextualizing concepts. Proceedings of the 15th International FLAIRS Conference (Special Track 'Categorization and Concept Representation: Models and Implications'), Pensacola Beach FL, May 14–17, American Association for Artificial Intelligence.
- Gabora, L. (2002) The beer can theory of creativity. In (P. Bentley & D. Corne, Eds.) Creative Evolutionary Systems. Morgan Kaufmann.
- Aerts, D., Aerts, S., Broekaert, J., & Gabora, L. (2000) The violation of Bell inequalities in the macroworld. Foundations of Physics, 30 (9). [quant-ph/0007041]
- Gabora, L. (2010). Revenge of the 'neurds': Characterizing creative thought in terms of the structure and dynamics of human memory. Creativity Research Journal, 22(1), 1-13.
- Gabora, L. (2017). Honing theory: A complex systems framework for creativity. Nonlinear Dynamics, Psychology, and Life Sciences, 21(1), 35–88. arXiv:1610.02484
