= Millennium Conferences on Creativity =

Event in Canada

The Millennium Conferences on Creativity in the Arts and Sciences was a series of workshops, symposia, and conferences staged in 1999 and 2000 across Canada to mark the arrival of the new Millennium. The organization of these events involved a consortium led by the National Arts Centre of Canada (NAC), the National Research Council of Canada (NRC), the Canada Council for the Arts, and their partners. These included the Canada Council for the Arts, the British Council, Canadian Institutes of Health Research, BCE-Média, the Canada Foundation for Innovation, the Natural Sciences and Engineering Research Council, Industry Canada, the Social Sciences and Humanities Research Council, the Humanities and Social Sciences Federation of Canada, the University of Ottawa, and the University of Alberta.

Some events were focused entirely on the themes of creativity, innovation, and collaboration between the arts and sciences. In other cases, individual speakers or projects were supported and presented within broader initiatives or conferences as being associated with the Millennium Conferences series.

The centrepiece conference, Creativity 2000 in Ottawa (June 21, 2000), featured high-profile speakers such as Nobel Laureate scientists and well-known authors. These included philosopher Mark Kingwell, writer Jane Urquhart, Sir John Maddox, filmmaker Don McKellar, and Sir Harry Kroto as well as Sir Arthur C. Clarke and fractal geometry inventor Benoit Mandelbrot (live via satellite).

The Symposium on Creativity and Innovation in Edmonton (May 25-26, 2000) produced a collection of learned papers and recommendations for the promotion of creativity and innovation notably for dedicated funding and programs to facilitate multi-disciplinary research and collaboration between the arts and sciences.

These recommendations and selected speeches from the series were published in the book Renaissance II: Canadian Creativity and Innovation in the New Millennium (2001), which attracted front-page news upon its release.
