= Teresa Amabile =

American academic

Teresa M. Amabile (born 1950) is an American psychologist, academic, and author whose research has focused on creativity, intrinsic motivation, innovation, and organizational behavior. She is the Edsel Bryant Ford Professor of Business Administration, Emerita, at the Harvard Business School, where she served on the faculty from 1995 until her retirement in 2024. She joined Harvard after 18 years on the psychology faculty at Brandeis University. Amabile is known for developing the componential theory of creativity, a framework explaining how domain expertise, creative thinking skills, and intrinsic motivation interact to produce creative performance. Her theoretical and empirical work has substantially influenced research in psychology, management, education, and organizational studies.

== Biography ==
She earned a Bachelor of Science degree in chemistry, graduating summa cum laude from Canisius College (now Canisius University) in 1972. Although trained initially as a chemist, Amabile became increasingly interested in understanding human behavior and creativity. She subsequently enrolled at Stanford University, where she pursued graduate studies in psychology. She received a Master of Arts in psychology in 1975 and completed her Doctor of Philosophy (Ph.D.) in psychology in 1977.

== Career ==
Following completion of her doctorate in 1977, Amabile joined the faculty of Brandeis University as an assistant professor of psychology. She was promoted to associate professor in 1984 and to full professor in 1990.

Amabile served as a research associate at the Center for Creative Leadership between 1984 and 1995 and held a visiting appointment at Harvard Business School, where she taught human resource management, during the 1992–1993 academic year.

Amabile joined the faculty of Harvard Business School in 1995 as a full professor and was subsequently named the Edsel Bryant Ford Professor of Business Administration, one of the school's endowed professorships.

At Harvard Business School she held several senior administrative positions. She served as Director of Research from 1995 to 1997 and again from 2009 to 2017, was Senior Associate Dean and Director of Research from 1998 to 2001, and chaired the Entrepreneurial Management Unit between 2002 and 2008. In 2016 she retired from her full professorship and became a Baker Foundation Professor before retiring from the active faculty in 2024.

Amabile’s teaching focused primarily on creativity, leadership, and research methods in organizational behavior. She supervised numerous doctoral students and became widely recognized for mentoring emerging scholars in organizational behavior and management research.

== Research ==
Amabile's research has focused on the psychology of creativity, intrinsic motivation, everyday work life, leadership, and the retirement transition. Over a career spanning nearly five decades, she has combined social psychology with management research to explain how individuals and organizations generate creative ideas and sustain innovation. Her work has influenced research in psychology, education, organizational behavior, entrepreneurship, and management, and has been widely applied in both academic and corporate settings.

=== Componential theory of creativity and consensual assessment technique ===
Amabile is best known for developing the componential theory of creativity, first articulated in the early 1980s and subsequently refined through later research.

The theory proposes that creativity results from the interaction of three primary individual components: domain-relevant skills, creativity-relevant processes, and intrinsic task motivation, with the latter being strongly influenced by the social environment. A later revision of the model included the social environment as a fourth component outside the individual, highlighting Amabile’s findings that organizational and other contextual factors can either facilitate or inhibit creative performance.

According to the theory, domain-relevant skills encompass an individual's knowledge, technical expertise, and talent within a particular field. Creativity-relevant processes refer to cognitive styles, personality types, problem-solving abilities, and skills that facilitate novel thinking. Intrinsic motivation—the interest, enjoyment, satisfaction, and personal sense of challenge in performing a task—is essential for creativity, and it can be undermined by extrinsic motivators such as harsh evaluation systems in the social environment.

The model argues that creativity is not solely an inherent personality trait but emerges from the interaction between individual capabilities and environmental conditions. The social environment can impact each of the three individual components of creativity but has its most immediate impact on intrinsic motivation. Consequently, organizational practices, leadership behavior, evaluation systems, and workplace culture play significant roles in determining whether creativity flourishes.

The componential theory has become one of the most widely cited frameworks in creativity research and has been adopted extensively in psychology, education, innovation management, and organizational studies.

For her earliest laboratory studies of the effects of the social environment on creativity – studies that led to the componential theory – Amabile developed the consensual assessment technique for measuring creativity. That technique, which relies on having research participants create products like collages or short poems that are later rated on creativity by independent judges, has been used by hundreds of creativity researchers in psychology, organizational behavior, and other fields.

=== Intrinsic motivation and creativity ===
Much of Amabile's early research examined how external influences affect creative performance. Building on experimental studies conducted during her doctoral work and early academic career, she demonstrated that certain forms of external control—including excessive evaluation, surveillance, competition, deadlines, and expected rewards—can reduce intrinsic motivation and consequently diminish creativity.

Her findings challenged traditional assumptions that stronger incentives invariably improve performance. Instead, she argued that while external rewards may enhance routine or algorithmic tasks, creative work depends heavily on individuals' intrinsic interest in the activity itself.

This research led to the intrinsic motivation principle of creativity: people are likely to be most creative when motivated primarily by curiosity, enjoyment, satisfaction, or a personal sense of challenge in the work rather than by external pressures or rewards.

=== Creativity in organizations ===
In the years prior to and after joining Harvard Business School, Amabile extended her research from laboratory experiments to organizational settings, examining how leadership, management practices, and workplace culture influence creativity and innovation. Through longitudinal field studies, interviews, and surveys, she found that creativity is fostered by supportive leadership, meaningful work, autonomy, and collaborative environments, while excessive bureaucracy, unrealistic time pressures, and organizational conflict can inhibit innovative thinking. Her research emphasized that sustained innovation depends not only on individual talent but also on organizational environments that encourage experimentation and learning.

=== The Progress Principle ===
Together with psychologist Steven J. Kramer, Amabile conducted a 15-year-long study of professionals working on complex projects, analyzing nearly 12,000 daily diary entries. This research discovered the progress principle: making progress in meaningful work—even through small steps forward—is a major driver of intrinsic motivation, positive emotions, and creativity in day-to-day work. This research program formed the basis of several articles and the 2011 book The Progress Principle: Using Small Wins to Ignite Joy, Engagement, and Creativity at Work, which has been widely applied in leadership development and organizational management.

=== The Retirement Transition ===
Amabile’s final research project as a faculty member at Harvard focused on the retirement transition. Working with collaborators and coauthors Lotte Bailyn, Marcy Crary, Douglas T. (“Tim”) Hall, and Kathy Kram over the course of ten years, she used over 200 in-depth interviews and surveys with knowledge workers at various career stages to investigate the psychological, relational, and life restructuring issues involved in retiring. The results of that research appear both in journal articles and the book Retiring: Creating a Life That Works for You.

== Awards ==
Amabile has received numerous honours for her contributions to psychology, creativity research, management scholarship, and doctoral education. She was awarded the Distinguished Alumni Award by Canisius College (now Canisius University) in 1993 and received an honorary Doctor of Humane Letters from the institution in 1997. At Harvard Business School, she received the Greenhill Award for contributions to the institution in 1997, followed by the Wyss Award for Excellence in Mentoring Doctoral Students and the Charles M. Williams Award for Outstanding Teaching and Mentoring in the HBS Doctoral Programs, both in 2016.

She received the E. Paul Torrance Award from the National Association for Gifted Children in 1998, the Best Paper Award in The Leadership Quarterly from the Center for Creative Leadership in 2004, and the Distinguished Scholar Award from the Society for Personality and Social Psychology in 2017.

In 2018, she received the Lifetime Achievement Award from both the Organizational Behavior Division of the Academy of Management and the Israel Organizational Behavior Conference. She was awarded an honorary doctorate by BI Norwegian Business School in 2019.

Amabile was included in the Thinkers50 ranking of influential management thinkers in 2011 and 2013 and was inducted into the Thinkers50 Hall of Fame in 2024. In 2020, a bibliometric analysis published in PLOS Biology identified her among the world's most highly cited scholars in business and management.

== Selected publications ==
=== Books and monographs ===
- Amabile, Teresa (1983). The Social Psychology of Creativity. Springer-Verlag. ISBN 978-3-540-90830-2.
- Hennessey, Beth A.; Amabile, Teresa (1987). Creativity and Learning. NEA Professional Library, National Education Association. ISBN 978-0-8106-1078-1.
- Amabile, Teresa (1989). Growing Up Creative: Nurturing a Lifetime of Creativity. Crown. ISBN 978-0-517-56939-9.
- Amabile, Teresa (1996-06-07). Creativity In Context: Update To The Social Psychology Of Creativity. Avalon Publishing. ISBN 978-0-8133-3034-1.
- Amabile, Teresa; Kramer, Steven (2011). The Progress Principle: Using Small Wins to Ignite Joy, Engagement, and Creativity at Work. Harvard Business Press. ISBN 978-1-4221-9857-5.
- Amabile, Teresa M.; Bailyn, Lotte; Crary, Marcy; Hall, Douglas T.; Kram, Kathy E. (2024-10-02). Retiring: Creating a Life That Works for You. Taylor & Francis. ISBN 978-1-040-12389-8.

=== Articles ===
- Amabile, Teresa M.; DeJong, William; Lepper, Mark R. (1976). "Effects of externally imposed deadlines on subsequent intrinsic motivation". Journal of Personality and Social Psychology. 34 (1): 92–98. doi:10.1037/0022-3514.34.1.92. ISSN 1939-1315.
- Ross, Lee D.; Amabile, Teresa M.; Steinmetz, Julia L. (1977). "Social roles, social control, and biases in social-perception processes". Journal of Personality and Social Psychology. 35 (7): 485–494. doi:10.1037/0022-3514.35.7.485. ISSN 1939-1315.
- Amabile, Teresa M. (1979). "Effects of external evaluation on artistic creativity". Journal of Personality and Social Psychology. 37 (2): 221–233. doi:10.1037/0022-3514.37.2.221. ISSN 1939-1315.
- Amabile, Teresa M. (November 1982). "Social psychology of creativity: A consensual assessment technique". Journal of Personality and Social Psychology. 43 (5): 997–1013. doi:10.1037/0022-3514.43.5.997. ISSN 1939-1315.
- Amabile, T. M.; Conti, R. (1999-12-01). "Changes in the work environment for creativity during downsizing". Academy of Management Journal. 42 (6): 630–640. doi:10.2307/256984. ISSN 0001-4273. JSTOR 256984.
- Amabile, Teresa M.; Barsade, Sigal G.; Mueller, Jennifer S.; Staw, Barry M. (2005). "Affect and Creativity at Work". Administrative Science Quarterly. 50 (3): 367–403. doi:10.2189/asqu.2005.50.3.367. ISSN 0001-8392.
- Hennessey, Beth A.; Amabile, Teresa M. (2010-01-01). "Creativity". Annual Review of Psychology. 61 (1): 569–598. doi:10.1146/annurev.psych.093008.100416. ISSN 0066-4308. PMID 19575609.
- Amabile, Teresa M.; Kramer, Steven J. (May 2011). "The power of small wins". Harvard Business Review.
- Fisher, Colin M.; Pillemer, Julianna; Amabile, Teresa M. (2025). "When the thought doesn't count: The dynamics of unhelpful help in creative organizations". Academy of Management Discoveries. 11 (3): 342–357. doi:10.5465/amd.2023.0160. ISSN 2168-1007.
