= Graham Wallas =

English intellectual (1858–1932)

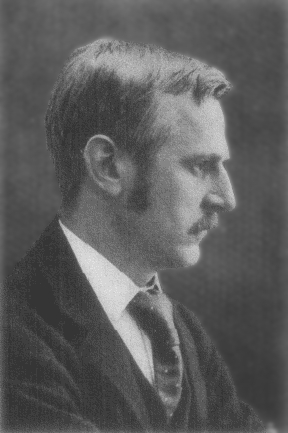
- Wallas in 1891
- Born: 31 May 1858; Monkwearmouth, Sunderland, England
- Died: 9 August 1932 (aged 74); Portloe, Cornwall, England
- Education: Corpus Christi College, Oxford
- Scientific career
- Fields: Social psychology
- Workplaces: London School of Economics

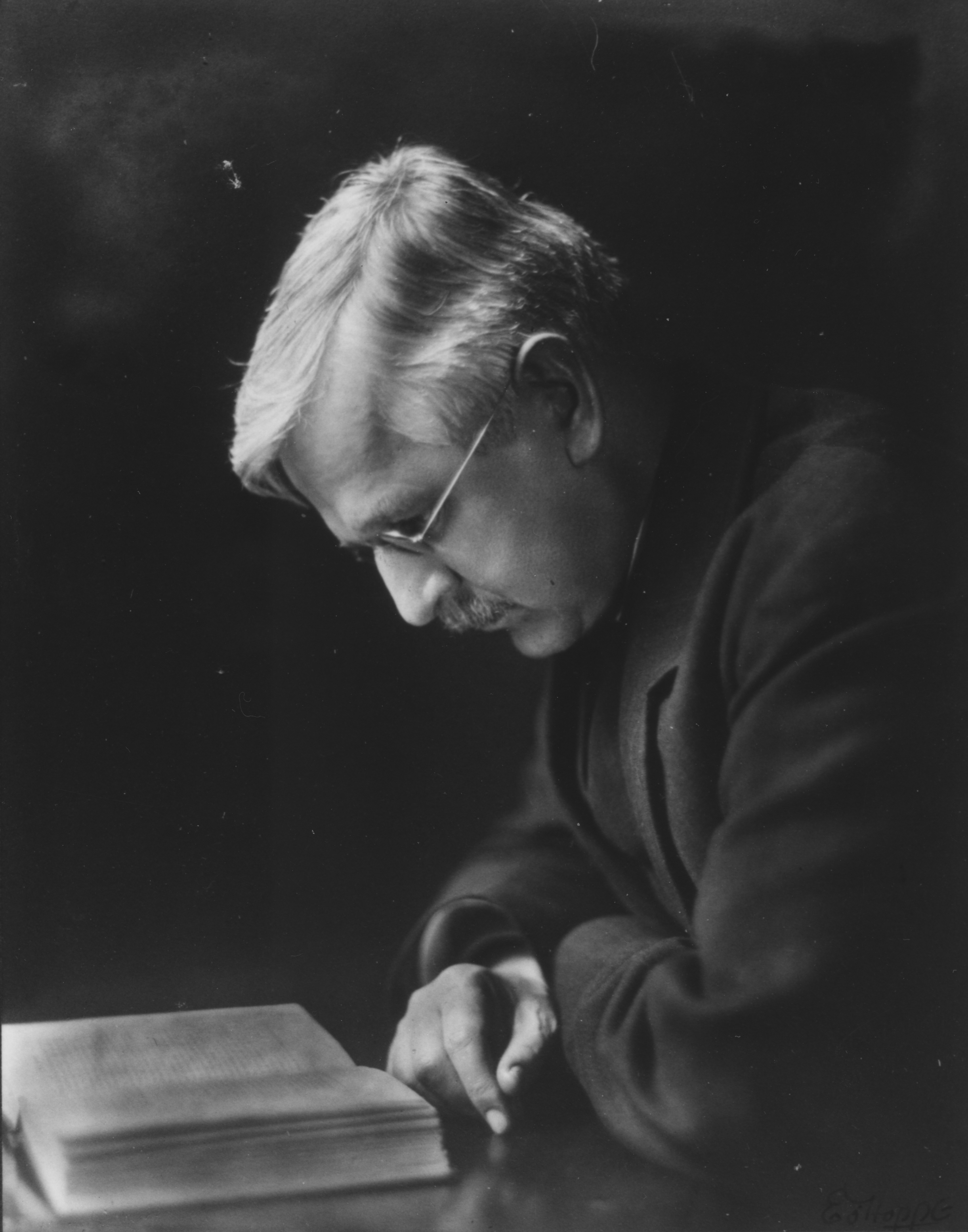
Graham Wallas portrait taken c. 1920s

Graham Wallas (31 May 1858 – 9 August 1932) was an English socialist, social psychologist, educationalist, a leader of the Fabian Society and a co-founder of the London School of Economics.

== Biography ==
Born in Monkwearmouth, Sunderland, Wallas was the older brother of Katharine, later to become a politician. He was educated at Shrewsbury School and Corpus Christi College, Oxford. It was at Oxford that Wallas abandoned his religion. He taught at Highgate School until 1885, when he resigned rather than participate in communion. He was President of the Rationalist Press Association and Humanists UK (then the Ethical Union).

Wallas joined the Fabian Society in April 1886, following his acquaintances Sidney Webb and George Bernard Shaw. He was to resign in 1904 in protest at Fabian support for Joseph Chamberlain's tariff policy. In 1894 he was elected to the London School Board as a Progressive.

On 18 December 1897, he married the writer Ada Radford. The following year, they had a daughter, May Wallas, who overcame diphtheria and flu to go to Newnham College, Cambridge, like her mother. May was to publish editions of many of her father's works, including the 1940 collection Men and Ideas: Essays by Graham Wallas.

Wallas became chair of the board's school management committee in 1897, and until he was defeated in 1907, the encouragement of educational reform and the raising of academic standards in state schools were some his main activities.

He was appointed a university extension lecturer in 1890 and lectured at the newly founded London School of Economics from 1895. In 1898, he published a biography of the early-19th-century utilitarian radical Francis Place. His most important academic writings were Human Nature in Politics (1908) and its successors, Great Society (1914) and Our Social Heritage (1921).

== Ideas ==
Wallas argued in The Great Society: A Psychological Analysis (1914) that a social-psychological analysis could explain the problems created by the impact of the Industrial Revolution on modern society. He contrasted the role of nature and nurture in modern society, concluded that humanity must depend largely on the improvements in nurture and put his faith in the development of stronger international operation.

In The Art of Thought (1926), he drew on the work of Hermann von Helmholtz and Henri Poincaré to propose one of the first complete models of the creative process, as consisting of the four-stage process of preparation (or saturation), incubation, illumination, and verification, which remains highly cited in scholarly works on creativity.

== Works ==
- Property Under Socialism (1889).
- What to Read: A List of Books for Social Reformers (1891).
- The Life of Francis Place, 1771–1854 (1898).
- Human Nature in Politics (1908).
- The Great Society: A Psychological Analysis (1914).
- Our Social Heritage (1921).
- The Art of Thought (1926).
- Social Judgment (1934).
