= Confabulation (neural networks) =

A confabulation, also known as a false, degraded, or corrupted memory, is a stable pattern of activation in an artificial neural network or neural assembly that does not correspond to any previously learned patterns. The same term is also applied to the human neural mistake-making process leading to a false memory.

== Cognitive science ==
In cognitive science, the generation of confabulatory patterns is symptomatic of some forms of brain trauma. In this, confabulations relate to pathologically induced neural activation patterns depart from direct experience and learned relationships. In computational modeling of such damage, related brain pathologies such as dyslexia and hallucination result from simulated lesioning and neuron death. Forms of confabulation in which missing or incomplete information is incorrectly filled in by the brain are generally modelled by the well known neural network process called pattern completion.

== Neural networks ==
Confabulation is central to a theory of cognition and consciousness by S. L. Thaler in which thoughts and ideas originate in both biological and synthetic neural networks as false or degraded memories nucleate upon various forms of neuronal and synaptic fluctuations and damage. Such novel patterns of neural activation are promoted to ideas as other neural nets perceive utility or value to them (i.e., the thalamo-cortical loop). The exploitation of these false memories by other artificial neural networks forms the basis of inventive artificial intelligence systems currently utilized in product design, materials discovery and improvisational military robots. Compound, confabulatory systems of this kind have been used as sensemaking systems for military intelligence and planning, self-organizing control systems for robots and space vehicles, and entertainment. The concept of such opportunistic confabulation grew out of experiments with artificial neural networks that simulated brain cell apoptosis. It was discovered that novel perception, ideation, and motor planning could arise from either reversible or irreversible neurobiological damage.

== Large language models ==
In March 2023, technology journalist Benj Edwards proposed confabulation as a more accurate alternative to hallucination for describing factual errors generated by large language models (LLMs) like those used with ChatGPT. Edwards argued that, in the context of LLMs, confabulation better captures the "creative gap-filling principle" at work when these models generate plausible-sounding but factually incorrect information without implying deception.

Unlike the term hallucination, which suggests perceiving something that is not there, confabulation describes how LLMs fill in missing information with fabricated content that appears coherent and convincing. As Edwards noted, "In human psychology, a 'confabulation' occurs when someone's memory has a gap and the brain convincingly fills in the rest without intending to deceive others." While LLMs do not function like human brains, this metaphor helps explain how these models produce false information that appears credible within their generated text.

The term has since gained traction in technical literature, and also in clinical discourse where researchers argue it more accurately describes how LLMs generate plausible but incorrect information without implying sensory perception or consciousness.

== Computational inductive reasoning ==
The term confabulation is also used by Robert Hecht-Nielsen in describing inductive reasoning accomplished via Bayesian networks. Confabulation is used to select the expectancy of the concept that follows a particular context. This is not an Aristotelian deductive process, although it yields simple deduction when memory only holds unique events. However, most events and concepts occur in multiple, conflicting contexts and so confabulation yields a consensus of an expected event that may only be minimally more likely than many other events. However, given the winner take all constraint of the theory, that is the event/symbol/concept/attribute that is then expected. This parallel computation on many contexts is postulated to occur in less than a tenth of a second. Confabulation grew out of vector analysis of data retrieval like that of latent semantic analysis and support vector machines. It is being implemented computationally on parallel computers.
