= Association of Professional Futurists =

Worldwide nonprofit organization

- APF logo since 2015
- Abbreviation: APF
- Formation: 2002; 24 years ago
- Type: Association
- Legal status: Nonprofit 501(c)(6)
- Headquarters: Washington, DC, USA
- Region served: Worldwide
- Members: 500 members, 40 countries
- Co-Chairs: Abril Chimal, Jeremy Wilken
- Treasurer: Seth Harrell
- Website: https://apf.org

The Association of Professional Futurists (APF) was founded in 2002 to validate the competencies of emerging futurists. As analysts, speakers, managers or consultants, APF's credentialed members cultivate strategic foresight for their organizations and clients. APF represents the professional side of the futures movement, while groups such as the World Futures Studies Federation, the World Future Society or The Millennium Project, represent its academic, popular, and activists expressions, respectively.

== History ==
APF emerged as a network of practicing futurists who were utilizing futurology methods. As the field approached the year 2000, it began to renew old calls and issue new ones to raise its internal standards in regards to ethics, competencies, and quality of work. While few felt that futurists—an occupational interest group at best—might become a full-fledged recognized profession via certification, the nine members of APF's founding board, including Peter Bishop, Jennifer Jarratt, Andy Hines, and Herb Rubenstein felt that foresight professionals should lead the global discussion about professional futures practice, encourage the use of futures and foresight in strategic decision making, and offer services, resources and training for foresight professionals to advance their skills and knowledge.

== Membership ==
The Association of Professional Futurists has 500 individual members from 40 countries, including authors and speakers, such as Clem Bezold, Sohail Inayatullah, Thomas Frey, Alexandra Levit, Richard Slaughter, and Amy Webb. Beyond individuals, it has renowned organizational members, such as Arup Foresight, the Foresight Alliance, the Institute for the Future-Palo Alto, Institute for Futures Research-Stellenbosch, Kantar Foresight, Kairos Futures, Kedge, Leading Futurists LLC, OCAD University, SAMI Consulting, Shaping Tomorrow, and Tamkang University, the Center for Post-Normal Studies, the Philippine Futures Thinking Society, and the Center for Engaged Foresight.

Instead of certifying members through coursework, professional futurists chose a pathway to credential its members, based on a peer-review assessment of their competencies. APF Professional Membership is conferred following a portfolio review to those who can, at the minimum, document performance in two of seven professional standards: consulting, organizational function, postgraduate degree, certificate program, speaking, teaching or writing. Full Members may use the appellation of APF after their name. Besides its Full Member program, APF also offers Provisional, Associate, and Student Memberships.

== Programs & Publications ==
APF Annual gatherings have been a key activity since its founding. The first gathering was an "Applied Futures Summit" in Seattle in April 2002, at which founders agreed to establish the Association. The second gathering was in Austin, TX, focused on "The Future of Futures," employing a scenario planning approach to explore the next decade of the field. Each subsequent gathering has focused on a particular topic, such as Design Thinking in Pasadena, CA, or the Future of Virtual Reality in Las Vegas, NV, Global Health in Seattle, WA, Blockchain Futures in Brisbane, Australia, or Resurgent City in Pittsburgh, PA.

APF hosts shorter "Pro Dev" workshops preceding larger conferences, in addition to annual gatherings, such as its September 2019 workshop in Mexico City on the "Praxis of Professional Futurists." As a digital learning platform, APF members also conduct various events online, ranging from Twitterchats, to webinars, to day-long learning festivals that address topics such as the future of museums, the future of machine intelligence, diverse futures, and design thinking. In 2020, APF began to host monthly member-only "Foresight Friday" webinars to showcase outstanding work by its professional members.

APF's flagship publication for members is its newsletter, published quarterly since 2003. The Compass features recaps of APF events, articles on future trends, methodology salons, book reviews, plus member news and promotions. Non-members may view themed or conference editions.

== Professionalism ==
Helping raise professionalism of futurists has been a perennial pursuit of the APF. In 2016, after three appointed studies over nine years, APF released a Foresight Competency Model, a product of 23 members from 4 continents that mapped the personal, academic, workplace, and technical competencies that futurists draw upon to support their work as consulting, organizational or academic futurists.

The Foresight Competency Model addresses the basic question of what one ought to be capable of doing as a professional futurist. At the center of the model is a circle of six foresight competencies: Framing, Scanning, Futuring, Designing, Visioning, and Adapting.

Six Foresight Competencies
Practice	Description
Framing	Defining the focal issue and current conditions
Scanning	Exploring signals of change and cross-impacts
Futuring	Identifying a baseline and alternative futures
Visioning	Developing and committing to a preferred future
Designing	Developing prototypes and artifacts to achieve goals
Adapting	Generating strategies for alternative futures

The Foresight Competency Model also defined sector competencies for different types of foresight professionals, such as consulting or organizational futurists, at the entry, associate, and senior career level. The origins of the Foresight Competency Model arose from previous taxonomies of futures research methods that offered guidelines for carrying out successful strategic foresight, developed over four decades.

== Futurist Recognition ==
APF's members annually select and recognize significant futures works. The first awards were announced in 2008. The ten 'most significant futures works' in 2008 included Peter Schwartz's The Art of the Long View, Wendell Bell's Foundations of Futures Studies: Human Science for a New Era, Bertrand de Jouvenel's L'Art de la Conjecture (The Art of Conjecture), and Ray Kurzweil's The Age of Spiritual Machines.

APF also has an annual student recognition program in which universities offering undergraduate, Masters and/or PhDs in foresight and futures studies can submit up to three student works that the instructor(s) considers being of exceptional quality in terms of originality, content, and contribution to the field.

As is the intention of many associations, APF has sought to improve the image and performance of the field. APF's credentialed members have written for and are cited in various journals and magazines such as Wired, Fast Company, Futures, Technological Forecasting and Social Change, Foresight, World Futures Review, The Futurist Journal, Futures & Foresight Science, and the Journal for Futures Studies.

APF is led by an international board of 12 futurists from five continents along with key volunteers. It is incorporated in the State of Delaware and is formed as a 501(c)(6) business league, with its headquarters in Washington, DC. It is considered exempt by the IRS as it is not organized for profit.

== See also ==
- List of futurologists
