= Corporate foresight =

Strategic management

Corporate foresight has been conceptualised by strategic foresight practitioners and academics working and/or studying corporations as a set of practices, a set of capabilities and an ability of a firm. It enables firms to detect discontinuous change early, interpret its consequences for the firm, and inform future courses of action to ensure the long-term survival and success of the company.

== Motivation ==
- The high mortality of companies that are faced by external change. For example, a study by Arie de Geus of Royal Dutch Shell came to the result that the life expectancy of a Fortune 500 company is below 50 years, because most companies are unable to adapt their organization to changes in their environment.
- The continuous need for companies to explore and develop new business fields, when their current business fields become unprofitable. For this reason companies need to develop specific abilities that allow them to identify new promising business fields and the ability to develop them.
- The difficulty and therefore often the lack of taking decisions under uncertainty.

=== To overcome three major challenges ===
There are three major challenges that make it difficult for organizations to respond to external change:

- A high rate of change that can be seen in (1) shortening of product lifecycles, (2) increased technological change, (3) increased speed of innovation, and (4) increased speed of the diffusion of innovations
- Large organizations' inherent "ignorance" that results from (1) a time frame that is too short for corporate strategic-planning cycles to produce a timely response, (2) corporate sensors that fail to detect changes in the periphery of the organizations, (3) an overflow of information that prevents top management to assess the potential impact, (4) the information does not reach the appropriate management level to decide on responses, and (5) information is systematically filtered by middle management that aims to protect their business unit.
- Inertia which is a result from: (1) the complexity of internal structures, (2) the complexity of external structures, such as global supply and value chains, (3) a lack of willingness to cannibalize current business fields, and extensive focus on current technologies that lead to cognitive inertia that inhibits organizations to perceive emerging technological breakthroughs.

=== Need ===
In addition to the need to overcome the barriers to future orientation a need to build corporate foresight abilities might also come from:

- a certain nature of the corporate strategy, for example aiming to be "aggressively growth oriented"
- a high complexity of the environment
- a particularly volatile environment
- a hostile environment

To operationalize the need for "peripheral vision", a concept closely linked to corporate foresight George S. Day and Paul J. H. Schoemaker developed a questionnaire with 24 questions.

== Implementation ==
=== The five practice dimensions ===
Based on case study research in 20 multinational companies, René Rohrbeck proposes a "Maturity Model for the Future Orientation of a Firm". Its five dimensions are:

- information usage describes the information which is collected
- method sophistication describes methods used to interpret the information
- people & networks describes characteristics of individual employees and networks used by the organization to acquire and disseminate information on change
- organization describes how information is gathered, interpreted and used in the organization
- culture describes the extent to which the corporate culture is supportive to the organizational future orientation

The model is operationalised through 20 elements which have four maturity levels each. These maturity levels are defined and described qualitatively, i.e. by short descriptions that are either true or not true for a given organization.

=== The three process steps ===
Organisations need to build foresight through three core process steps, which build on specific practices:

- Perceiving: Practices that firm use to identify the factors that drive environmental change. Firm aim to identify (weak) signals ahead of competition to gain a lead-time advantage
- Prospecting: Practices through which firms engage in sensemaking and strategizing. Practices include working with analogies, scenario analysis, systems-dynamics mapping, and backcasting
- Probing: Probing practices are exercise in dedicated accelerator units and in units/projects that receive the mandate to act. This may include prototyping, R&D projects, consumer tests, internal venturing, strategic initiatives or external venturing. Probing practices aim at legitimizing and starting a new course of action and ultimately at gaining a competitive advantage.

Corporate foresight can be expected to be a determinant of the quality of strategic conversation. It will also, in line with digitalisation of other organisational processes, be driven by online platforms that allow broadening the scope of the people who can get involved in defining new courses of action.

=== Innovation management ===
Through an empirical investigation Rohrbeck identified three roles that corporate foresight can play to enhance the innovation management of a firm:

- In the Initiator role Corporate Foresight supports the identification of new customer needs and emerging technologies. In addition it might also support the monitoring of competitors. To identify emerging technologies methods such as Technology Scouting can be used. Its particular appeal is the use of expert networks, that can also be used to later source the technologies.
- In the Strategist role Corporate Foresight supports the identification of emerging business fields and supports the internal renewal and re-positioning efforts of the firm.
- In the Opponent role Corporate Foresight uses the insights from the environmental scanning to challenge ongoing R&D projects. The aim is to ensure that innovation initiatives are continuously benchmarked against emerging technologies and confronted with current customer needs.

The study also showed that only a small number of firms have implemented the third role. In the majority of firms the aims of an innovation development project that have been defined are not challenged after the initial decision has been taken. This carries the risk that changing environmental conditions threaten the success of the innovation in development.

=== Foresight and external search ===
External search, understood as all organisational activities that involve the creation and recombination of knowledge from a wide range of external sources outside the boundaries of the firm, has recently been suggested as one of the key research frontiers for corporate foresight. Corporate foresight utilising external search for knowledge entails the usage of novel methods to monitor external development. Among these novel methods, Social Media Analytics for external search for knowledge and open foresight that enable firms to tune in to weak signals and scan the periphery has been shown to hold particular potential.

== Benefits ==
Firms that have applied corporate foresight have received a number of benefits:

- Identify changes ahead of competition
- Trigger innovation initiatives
- Challenge innovation projects to make them more successful
- Overcoming dominant mental models that stand in the way of necessary organisational response
- Moderate strategic discussions
- Breaking away from path dependency
- Support the search, development, and acquisition of strategic resources

On a higher level it has been documented that firms will be able to

- Enhance their perception on the external environment
- Trigger strategic organisational responses
- Trigger new innovation initiatives
- Contribute to organisational learning
- Shaping the future (by influencing other players to act)

More recently a longitudinal study, that tracked 83 companies over a period of 7 years, has found that firms that have the right maturity level of corporate foresight practices (high future preparedness) can expect an on average 33% higher profitability and a 200% higher market capitalisation growth, when compared to the average.

== Case studies ==
In recent years corporate foresight has become more professional and widespread. Documented examples of organizations applying corporate foresight practices include:

- Automobile: Audi, Daimler,
- Chemical: BASF,
- Consumer goods: Pepsi,
- Engineering and Electronics: General Electric, Siemens,
- Financial service industry: Deutsche Bank,
- Information and communication technology industry: Cisco, Deutsche Telekom, EIT Digital, France Telecom,
- Oil and gas industry: Shell
- Professional services: KPMG
- Transport industry: SNCF

Such organizations typically use corporate foresight to support strategic management, identify new business fields and increase their innovation capacity.

== See also ==
- Dynamic capabilities
- Forecasting
- Foresight (future studies)
- Futurology
- Real options valuation
- Scenario planning
- Strategic foresight
- Technology forecasting
- Technology scouting

== Scientific Journals ==
- Technological Forecasting and Social Change
- Futures
- Futures & Foresight Science
- Foresight
- Journal of Futures Studies
