= Stuart Candy =

Australian futurist designer

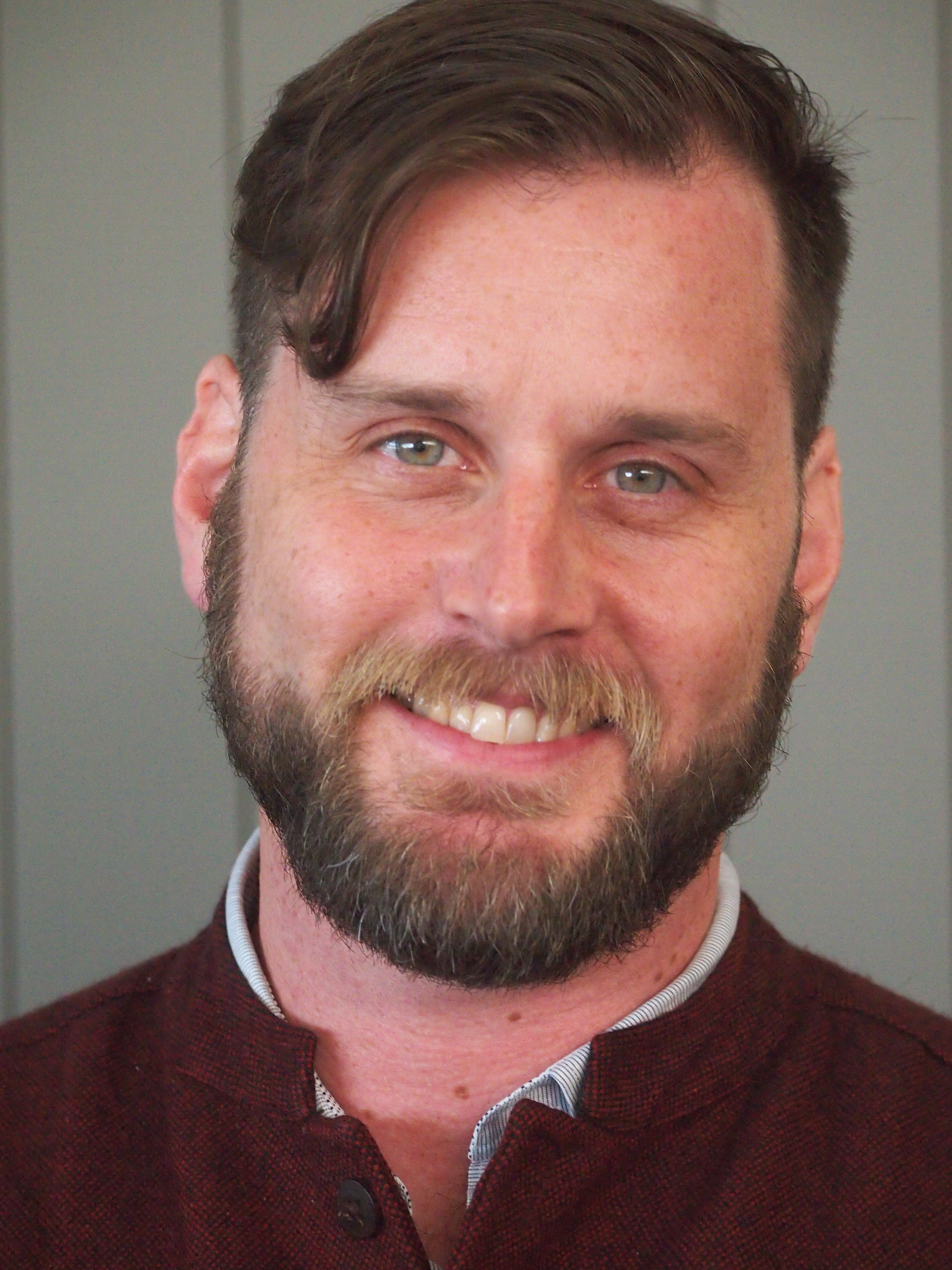
- Born: Australia

Academic background
- Education: LLB and BA in the history and philosophy of science from University of Melbourne, PhD in Political Science from the University of Hawai'i at Manoa

Academic work
- Discipline: Futures, Strategic Foresight, Experiential Futures
- Sub-discipline: Experience Design
- Institutions: Berggruen Fellow at University of Southern California

Stuart Candy is an Australian futurist and designer. Candy is a Fellow of the World Futures Studies Federation, Museum of Tomorrow. He is the first Research Fellow of The Long Now Foundation. His work deals with futurism and designing experiential futures through immersive storytelling.

== Career ==
Candy holds degrees in Arts and Law from the University of Melbourne, and an MA and PhD in Political Science and Alternative Futures from the University of Hawaii at Manoa, completed on graduate degree fellowships awarded by the East–West Center. There, he studied under early futurist Jim Dator.

Candy was the first Fellow of the Long Now Foundation in San Francisco and the first artist in residence with the Museum of Tomorrow in Rio de Janeiro. He is a founding advisor and contributor to the initiative to embed futures throughout the International Federation of Red Cross and Red Crescent Societies in Geneva.

== Futurism Design and Advocacy ==
In 2010, Candy and Jake Dunagan, director of the Governance Futures Lab at Institute for the Future, created Our Plastic Century at the California Academy of Sciences, a display of four large water coolers with representations of plastic pollution from the years 1910, 1960, 2010, and 2030.

At the first Emerge in 2012, an annual futurist event at Arizona State University, Candy and Duagan ran Found futures: the people who vanished, a "design fiction playshop" to collaboratively create "a design fiction artifact" reconceptualizing life in Phoenix, Arizona.

In 2014, Candy and Jeff Watson, as the Situation Lab, published the card game The Thing from the Future. The game prompts 2-6 players to use a deck of 108 cards to come up with "entertaining and thought-provoking descriptions" or hypothetical objects from the near, medium, and long-term future. Players come up with "things from the future" (headlines, posters, games, monuments etc.) related to a scenario about a topic, a state, a time period, and a mood derived from the cards, allowing the players to develop their own future scenarios, which they then assess and discuss. In 2018, Candy and Dunagan ran the game for a group of city mayors as part of SXSW.

In 2017, Candy created the "NurturePod", a hypothetical near-future technology product that automates raising a baby. It featured a model of a baby wearing a small VR visor, sitting in an egg-shaped booster seat. The NurturePod was displayed at M HKA, the Museum of Contemporary Art in Antwerp, Belgium.

== Book ==
In 2019, Candy and Cher Potter published Design and Futures, a collection of 30 essays and pieces of writing documenting design futures discourse. The collection originally appeared in issues of the Journal of Futures Studies and includes pieces by Minority Report production designer Alex McDowell, Museum of Modern Art curator Paola Antonelli, author of Hyperobjects Timothy Morton, and other futurists and artists.

== Awards ==
- Most Significant Futures Work Award (2017) for Designing an Experiential Scenario: The People Who Vanished from The Association of Professional Futurists
- Most Significant Futures Work Award (2015) for the card game The Thing From the Future from The Association of Professional Futurists
- Official Selection 2014, IndieCade International Festival of Independent Games for the card game The Thing From The Future
- Norman Meller Award (2009) for his academic achievements as a recent graduate, awarded by the Department of Political Science at the University of Hawaii at Manoa
