= Futures techniques =

Futures studies lessons learned methods

Futures techniques used in the multi-disciplinary field of futurology by futurists in Americas and Australasia, and futurology by futurologists in EU, include a diverse range of forecasting methods, including anticipatory thinking, backcasting, simulation, and visioning. Some of the anticipatory methods include, the delphi method, causal layered analysis, environmental scanning, morphological analysis, and scenario planning.

== Anticipatory thinking protocols ==
=== Delphi method ===
The Delphi method is a popular technique used in futurology. It was developed by Gordon and Helmer in 1953 at RAND. It can be defined as a method for structuring a group communication process, so that the process is effective in allowing a group of individuals, as a whole, to deal with a complex problem.

It uses the iterative, independent questioning of a panel of experts to assess the timing, probability, significance and implications of factors, trends and events in the relation to the problem being considered. Panelists are not brought together but individually questioned in rounds. After the initial round, the panelists are given lists of anonymous answers from other panelists which they can use to refine their own views.

Studies employing Delphi method tend to be difficult to perform. The application of the Delphi method requires a great deal of attention to the selection of participating experts and the questionnaires have to be scrupulously prepared and tested in advance. The initial preparation and follow-up rounds of questioning of the panelists tends to be time consuming.

Delphi's primary strength is its ability to explore, tranquilly and objectively, issues that require judgement. Unlike panel sessions, the iterative Delphi method allows the forecasting and assessment to be done without the effect of strong personalities or reputations influencing other panelists and also overcomes the difficulty of getting all experts together in a single time and place.

=== Causal layered analysis (CLA) ===
This method, developed by Sohail Inayatullah, is one of the newest developments in Futurology. Causal layered analysis focuses on "opening up" the present and past to create alternative futures rather than on developing a picture of a particular future.

It is concerned with the vertical dimension of futures studies, with the layers of analysis. CLA is based on the assumption that the way in which a problem is formulated changes the policy solutions and the actors in charge of initiating transformations.

The key principle of the method is using and integrating different ways of knowing.

There are a number of benefits arising from the application of this method. Causal layered analysis increases the range and richness of scenarios; leads to inclusion of different ways of knowing among participants in workshops; appeals to wider range of individuals through incorporation of non-textual and artistic elements; extends the discussion beyond the obvious to the deeper and marginal; and leads to the policy actions that can be educated by alternative layers of analysis.

=== Environmental scanning ===
Environmental scanning is usually used at the start of a futures project. It aims at broad exploration of all major trends, issues, advancements, events and ideas across a wide range of activities. Information is collected from many different sources, such as newspapers, magazines, Internet, television, conferences, reports, and also science-fiction books. Various tools and methodologies are used by large corporations to systematically scope their external environment. An example is the widely used FUTURE structure developed by futurist Patrick Dixon described in his book Futurewise - F(ast), U(rban), T(ribal), U(niversal), R(adical), E(thical). Attention needs to be given to potential Wild Cards - low probability (or uncertain probability) but potentially high impact events.

Scanning is used to build up a comprehensive picture of factors that could impact strategy.

Four types of indicators can be examined in the process of environmental scanning:

1. Lone signals (individual factors that might indicate change)
2. Landmark events (in various areas of life)
3. Forecasts of experts
4. Statistical descriptions (to portray development of elements of the study).

=== Morphological analysis ===
Morphological analysis is a technique developed by Fritz Zwicky (1966, 1969) for exploring all the possible solutions to a multi-dimensional, non-quantified problem complex.

As a problem structuring and problem solving technique, morphological analysis was designed for multi-dimensional, non-quantifiable problems where causal modeling and simulation do not function well or at all. Zwicky developed this approach to address seemingly non-reducible complexity. Using the technique of cross consistency assessment (CCA), the system however does allow for reduction, not by reducing the number of variables involved, but by reducing the number of possible solutions through the elimination of the illogical solution combinations in a grid box.

MA has also been employed for the identification of new product opportunities. The technique involves mapping options in order to attain an overall perspective of possible solutions. It comprises the two main activities: a systematic analysis of a current and future structure of the area including the gaps in that structure, stimulation for creation of new alternative, which could fill the gaps and meet any needs.

=== Scenario planning ===
Scenarios are one of the most popular and persuasive methods used in the Futurology. Government planners, corporate strategists and military analysts use them in order to aid decision-making. The term scenario was introduced into planning and decision-making by Herman Kahn in connection with military and strategic studies done by RAND in the 1950s.

It can be defined as a rich and detailed portrait of a plausible future world, one sufficiently vivid that a planner can clearly see and comprehend the problems, challenges and opportunities that such an environment would present.

A scenario is not a specific forecast of the future, but a plausible description of what might happen. Scenarios are like stories built around carefully constructed plots based on trends and events. They assist in selection of strategies, identification of possible futures, making people aware of uncertainties and opening up their imagination and initiating learning processes.

One of the key strengths of the scenario process is its influence on the way of thinking of its participants. A mindset, in which the focus is placed on one possible future, is altered towards the balanced thinking about a number of possible alternative futures.

=== Future history ===
A future history is a postulated history of the future. Some authors for example science fiction writers construct as a common background for fiction. The author may include a timeline of events for this history. A related field is alternate history, which assumes that the event or events at a point in past history turned out differently (POD=point of departure) and then draws a fictional future timeline from that event.

=== Monitoring ===
It is a process that aims at evaluation of events, as they occur or just after. It involves activities like scanning, detecting, projecting, assessing, responding and tracking. Monitoring is one of the fundamental activities performed by Futures Studies.

=== Content analysis ===
This technique is used for the systematic and objective study of the particular aspects of various 'messages'. Such 'messages' can be found in books, journals, newspapers, private letters, publications of political parties, reports, surveys, interviews, television, Internet and so on. This method, in order to be reliable and valid, needs to be performed with high competency.

== Backcasting (eco-history) ==
It is a technique that often is pointed out as an opposite to forecasting. It involves identification of a particular scenario and tracing its origins and lines of development back to the present.

=== Back-view mirror analysis ===
It builds upon the assumption that any future oriented group process has to manage peoples' difficulties in thinking into the future. These difficulties can arise from the fears as well as from the lack of experience in futures thinking.

Back-view mirror analysis allows dealing with the fears related to the future by creating a new perspective that looks to the past instead of starting the process in the present. The method is used to perform qualitative analysis of the past using both quantitative and qualitative data.

=== Cross-impact analysis ===
The method was developed by Theodore Gordon and Olaf Helmer in 1966 in an attempt to answer a question whether perceptions of how future events may interact with each other can be used in forecasting.

As it is well known, most events and trends are interdependent in some ways. Cross-impact analysis provides an analytical approach to the probabilities of an element in a forecast set, and it helps to assess probabilities in view of judgements about potential interactions between those elements.

The technique can be used by individuals and groups at an elementary qualitative level as well as it can be employed to perform more complicated and intensive quantitative analysis. One of its strengths is that it forces the attention towards "chains of causality: x affects y; y affects z". On the other side it can be very fatiguing and monotonous.

== Futures workshops ==
Future workshops were developed by Robert Jungk in order to allow anybody to become involved in creating their preferred future rather than being subjected to decisions made by experts. Future workshops are very strongly action oriented. They aim, first to imagine the desired future, and then to plan it and implement it.

Future workshops have four distinctive phases:

1. In the first preparatory phase the issue that will be considered is identified and the structure and details of sessions are arranged.
2. The operative phase involves clarification of the issue considered and articulation of negative experiences in the present situation.
3. In the fantasy stage participants verbalise their desires, dreams, fantasies and views about the future in a free idea generation session. The participants are asked to forget all the limitations and obstacles of the present reality.
4. The last step involves: analysis of the feasibility of ideas and solutions generated in the fantasy phase; recognition of limits and barriers for implementation and discovering how they can be overcome.

A similar method is found in Future Search.

=== Failure mode and effects analysis ===
Failure mode and effects analysis (FMEA) is a safety analysis method first developed for systems engineering which examines potential failures in products or processes. It may be used to evaluate risk management priorities for mitigating known threat-vulnerabilities.

FMEA helps select remedial actions that reduce cumulative impacts of life cycle consequences (risks) from a systems failure (fault).

=== Measured Action ===
Measured Action is an action that improves Production Capability by a measured amount, (e.g. if X hours of overtime then Y additional files transmitted). Measured actions enhance FMEA by perfectly matching calculated risks with calculated contingencies to ensure a specific outcome.

=== Futures biographies ===
This method, also called futures imagining, aims to create individual imaginaries, to gather peoples' views on the future and to examine them in the study of collective future. Peoples' expectations and opinions are considered as an important indication of possible goals and to possible directions that can influence peoples' actions and in result steer the future.

=== Futures wheel ===
The method is a form of structured brainstorming that aims at identifying and packaging secondary and tertiary consequences of trends and events. A trend or event is placed in the middle of a piece of paper and then small spokes are drawn wheel-like from the centre. Primary impacts and consequences are written in circles of the first ring.

Then secondary consequences of each primary impact are derived forming the second ring. This ripple effect continues until there is a clear picture of implications that the event or trend can have. Futures wheel is a very simple but powerful technique for drawing out people's opinions and ideas. However, it is sensitive to underlying assumptions.

=== Artifacts from the Future ===
Artifact from the future is a foresight tool to facilitate thinking about the future. It visualizes the possibilities in the form of fictional 3d objects, labels, or videos and provides a tangible experience of the future.

=== Relevance tree ===
It is an analytical technique that subdivides a large subject into increasingly smaller subtopics. The relevance tree has a form of a hierarchical structure that begins with a high level of abstraction and moves down with greater degree of detail in the following levels of the tree. It is a powerful technique that helps to ensure that a given problem or issue is broken into comprehensive detail and that important connections among the elements considered are presented in both current and potential situations.

== Simulation and modelling ==
Simulation and modelling are computer-based tools developed to represent reality. They are widely used to analyse behaviours and to understand processes. Models allow demonstration of past changes as well as the examination of various transformations and their impact on each other and other considered factors.

They can help to understand the connections between factors and events and to examine their dynamics. Simulation is a process that represents a structure and change of a system. In simulation some aspects of reality are duplicated or reproduced, usually within the model. The main purpose of simulation is to discern what would really happen in the real world if certain conditions, imitated by the model, developed.

Although modelling and simulation became even more popular with the development of computing technology, application of these techniques have certain limits. Models represent a simplification of a system that is being examined; therefore the results need to be carefully considered.

As the complexity of real systems increases models need to be more and more complex to represent the reality most accurately. In result, they may become increasingly difficult to understand and to be operated. Their complex nature can cause problems with using and managing results.

As models constitute a simpler version of reality, certain factors can be omitted, and in consequence can lead to mistakes. Such mistakes are not easy to be found and corrected.

=== Social network analysis ===
Social network analysis (also sometimes called network theory) has emerged as a key technique in modern sociology, anthropology, social psychology and organizational studies, as well as a popular topic of speculation and study.

Research in a number of academic fields have demonstrated that social networks operate on many levels, from families up to the level of nations, and play a critical role in determining the way problems are solved, organizations are run, and the degree to which individuals succeed in achieving their goals.

=== Systems engineering ===
An interdisciplinary approach to engineering systems that is inherently complex, since the behavior of and interaction among system components is not always well defined.

Defining and characterizing such systems and subsystems, and the interactions among them, is the primary aim of systems engineering. On very large programs, a systems architect may be designated to serve as an interface between the user/sponsor and systems engineer.

RADM Grace Hopper, USNR was quoted as saying "Life was simple before World War II. After that, we had systems."

== Visioning ==
Visioning is a popular method in the studies of desirable futures and the one that gives emphasis to values. It is extensively used in urban planning. The visioning process is based on the assumption that images of the future lead peoples' present behaviours, guide choices and influence decisions. Images of the future can be positive or negative and cause different responses according to the perceptions.

Vision is usually seen as a positive, desirable image of the future and can be defined as a compelling, inspiring statement of the preferred future that the authors and those who subscribe to the vision want to create.

There are a number of issues that need to be addressed while using the visioning method. Vision comprises peoples' values, wishes, fears and desires. In order to make the visioning process work it is necessary to ensure that it is not making an idealistic wish-list; that vision is an image of the future shared by a whole community; and that the vision is translatable into reality.

== Trend analysis ==
Trend analysis is one of the most often used methods in forecasting. It aims to observe and register the past performance of a certain factor and project it into the future. It involves analysis of two groups of trends: quantitative, mainly based on statistical data, and qualitative, these are at large concerned with social, institutional, organisational and political patterns.

In the quantitative trend analysis data is plotted along a time axis, so that a simple curve can be established. Short term forecasting seems quite simple; it becomes more complex when the trend is extrapolated further into the future, as the number of dynamic forces that can change direction of the trend increases. This form of simple trend extrapolation helps to direct attention towards the forces, which can change the projected pattern.

A more elaborated curve that uses times series analysis can often reveal surprising historical and current data patterns. The qualitative trend analysis is one of the most demanding and creative methods in Futures Studies.

As trends never speak for themselves, the identification and description of patterns is partly empirical and partly creative activity. The most challenging part of qualitative trends analysis is identification of a tendency early, as recognition of a mature trend is "relatively useless" in influencing anyone's behaviour.

=== Adaptive role-playing ===
Although similar to decision theory, game theory studies decisions that are made in an environment where various players interact. In other words, game theory studies choice of optimal behavior when costs and benefits of each option are not fixed, but depend upon the choices of other individuals.

ALL-WinWin collaborative efforts require group decision support systems (GDSS) that enable the knowledge management community of practice to assure sustainable mutually-beneficial results.

== See also ==
- Calculating demand forecast accuracy
- Computer supported brainstorming
- Consensus forecast
- Critical design
- Design fiction
- Environmental impact assessment
- Forecasting
- Foresight
- Futures studies
- Morphological analysis
- Optimism bias
- Planning
- Prediction
- Prediction market
- Reference class forecasting
- Science fiction prototyping
- Strategic foresight
- Technology forecasting
- Pre-mortem
