= Strategic foresight =

Planning-oriented discipline

Strategic foresight is a planning-oriented discipline related to futures studies. In a business context, a more action-oriented approach has become well known as corporate foresight.

== Definition and idea ==
Strategy is a high level plan to achieve one or more goals under conditions of uncertainty. Strategic foresight happens when any planner uses scanned inputs, forecasts, alternative futures exploration, analysis and feedback to produce or alter plans and actions of the organization. Scenario planning plays a prominent role in strategic foresight.

Strategic planning always includes analysis, but it may or may not involve serious foresight on the way to developing a plan, or taking an action. A consideration of possible futures (alternative futures) and of probable futures (forecasts, predictions) is important to developing a preferred future (plan), even the simple mental plans made prior to taking an action. It is the job of the strategic foresight professional to make sure appropriately diverse and relevant inputs, forecasts, and alternatives are considered in the analysis, decision making and planning processes, that plans are appropriately communicated and that when actions are taken, appropriate feedback occurs and after action reviews take place to improve the foresight process.

Strategic foresight is a growing practice in corporate foresight in large companies. Its use is also growing in government and non-profit organisations. In recent years, researchers and managers have also elaborated more on the links between foresight and innovation management.

Strategic foresight can be practiced at multiple levels, including:

1. Personal – "Personal and professional goal-setting and action planning"
2. Organizational – "Carrying out tomorrows' business better"
3. Social – "Moving toward the next civilisation – the one that lies beyond the current hegemony of techno/industrial/capitalist interests"

== Quotes ==
- "Strategic foresight is the ability to create and maintain a high-quality, coherent and functional forward view, and to use the insights arising in useful organisational ways. For example to detect adverse conditions, guide policy, shape strategy, and to explore new markets, products and services. It represents a fusion of futures methods with those of strategic management" (R. Slaughter (1999), p. 287).

== See also ==
- Causal Layered Analysis (CLA)
- Chain-linked model
- Corporate foresight
- Critical design
- Design fiction
- Forecasting
- Foresight (future studies)
- Futurology
- Optimism bias
- Reference class forecasting
- Science fiction prototyping
- Strategic Foresight Group
- Technology forecasting
- Technology scouting

== Scientific journals ==
- Technological Forecasting and Social Change
- Futures
- Futures & Foresight Science
- Foresight
- Journal of Futures Studies
- European Journal of Futures Research

== Conferences ==
- European Conference on Strategic Foresight
