= Sohail Inayatullah =

Pakistani-born Australian academic, futures studies researcher

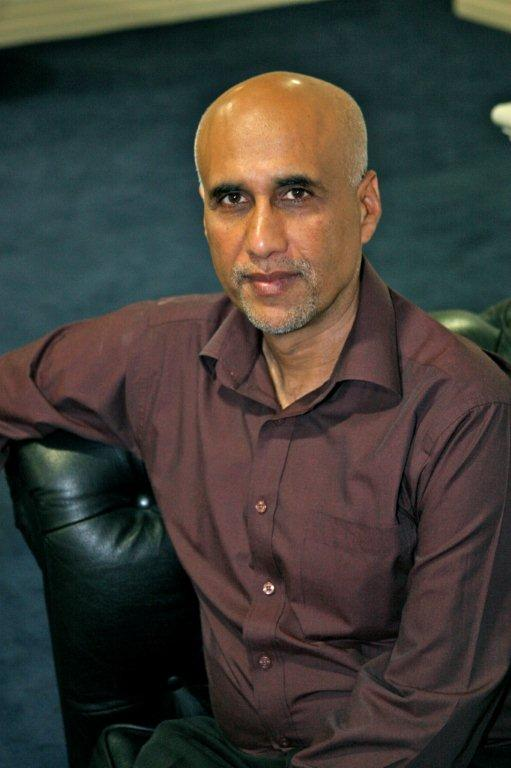
- Born: 1958 (age 67–68); Lahore, Pakistan
- Occupations: Author; futurist; keynote speaker
- Known for: Causal layered analysis
- Spouse: Ivana Milojevic
- Children: 2
- Awards: Honorary Doctorate, Universiti Sains Malaysia

Academic background
- Education: University of Hawaiʻi; 1975-1979 - BA; 1979-1981 - MA; 1987-1990 - PhD

Academic work
- Institutions: UNESCO Chair in Futures Studies; Sejahtera Centre for Sustainability and Humanity; Professor of Futures Studies, College of Education, Tamkang University
- Notable works: Macrohistroy and Macrohistorians (1997); What Works: Case Studies in the Practice of Foresight (2015); Understanding Sarkar (2002); CLA Reader (2004); CLA 2.0 (2015); CLA 3.0 (2022)
- Website: Official website

Sohail Inayatullah is a Pakistani-born Australian academic, futures studies researcher and a professor at the Graduate Institute of Futures Studies at Tamkang University in Taipei, Taiwan.

== Early life ==
Born in 1958 in Lahore, Pakistan, to a father who worked as a researcher for the United Nations and a Sufi mother, he grew up in numerous countries including the United States, Switzerland and Malaysia. His main influences include James Dator, Johan Galtung, William Irwin Thompson and in particular P. R. Sarkar.

== Academic contributions ==
Inayatullah is most famous for introducing and pioneering the futures technique of causal layered analysis, that uses a four-layered approach to bring about transformative change. He introduced the idea in a widely cited paper for Futures. He also edited and wrote the introductory chapter for the Causal Layered Analysis (CLA) Reader. He has described the idea for a popular audience in an article for The Futurist and a TEDx talk.

Inayatullah's work on CLA was examined in a book by Jose W. Ramos in 2003. He also invented the method known as, the Futures Triangle, the Integrated Scenario Method, and with Ivana Milojevic, the Change Progression Scenario Method. Inayatullah is ranked in the top two% of the worlds scientists based on citation impact

== Academic positions ==
In addition to his role at Tamkang University, Inayatullah is the UNESCO Chair in Futures Studies at the Sejahtera Centre for Sustainability and Humanity, IIUM, Malaysia From 2016 to 2021, he was the UNESCO Chair in Futures Studies at USIM, Malaysia. He was also an adjunct professor at the Centre for Policing, Intelligence and Counter-Terrorism, Macquarie University, Sydney, from 2011 to 2014 and adjunct professor at the University of the Sunshine Coast (Faculty of Social Sciences and the Arts) from 2001 to 2020.

== Role in journals and web publications ==
Inayatullah is co-editor (along with Jose Ramos, Anisah Abdullah, and Kuo-Hua Chen) of the Journal of Futures Studies, one of the top journals in futures studies. He is on the editorial boards of Futures, Journal of Foresight and Thought Leadership, World Futures, Futures and Foresight Science, World Futures Review and foresight.

Inayatullah is also the co-founder of educational think tank Metafuture.org along with Dr. Ivana Milojević.

== Other affiliations ==
Inayatullah is a member of the World Future Society and blogs at the Journal of Futures Studies website. He is also a Fellow of the World Futures Studies Federation. He has also voiced his support for the Campaign for the Establishment of a United Nations Parliamentary Assembly, an organisation which campaigns for democratic reform in the United Nations.
