= Peter C. Bishop =

American futurist and author

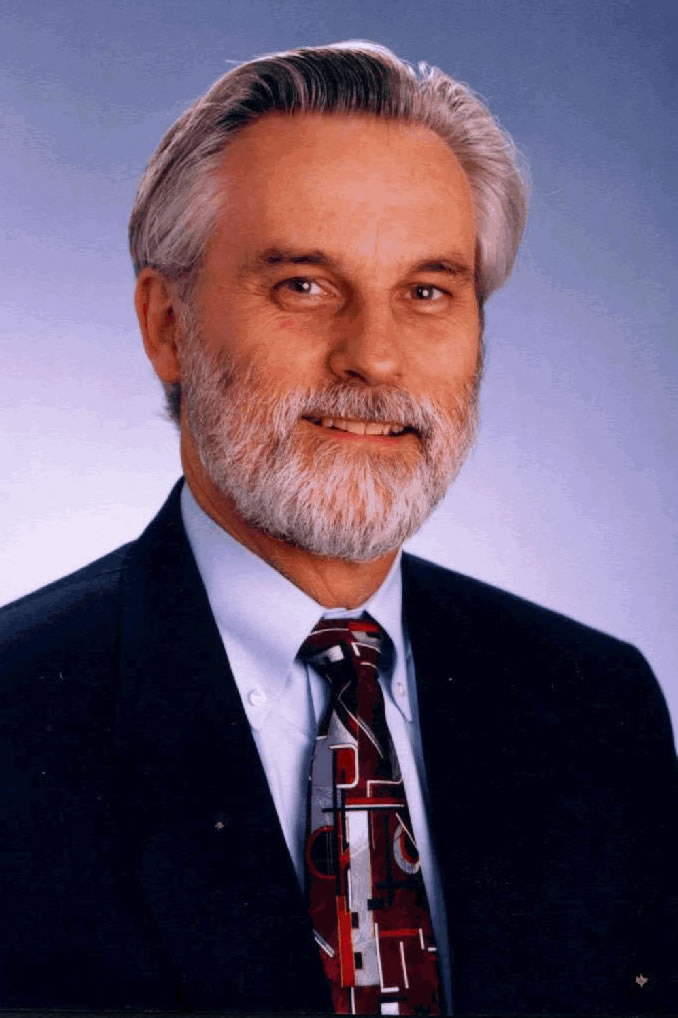
- Education: St. Louis University; Michigan State University
- Occupations: Futurist, author

Peter C. Bishop is a professional futurist (futurologist), a retired Associate Professor of Strategic Foresight, and the former Director of the graduate program in Futures Studies at the University of Houston.

== Early career ==
In 1968, Bishop received a bachelor's degree in philosophy from St. Louis University where he also studied mathematics and physics. He grew up in St. Louis, Missouri where he was a member of the Society of Jesus (Jesuits) for seven years. From Michigan State University, he received an M.A. (sociology) in 1971 and a Ph.D. (sociology) in 1974. Bishop started teaching at Georgia Southern College (now Georgia Southern University) in 1973 where he specialized in social problems and political sociology.

== Professional career ==
Bishop came to the University of Houston in 2005, after having taught futures studies at the University of Houston–Clear Lake since 1982. Specializing in techniques for long term forecasting and planning, he has published a book on the subject, Thinking about the Future: Guidelines for Strategic Foresight, with co-author Andy Hines. He delivers keynote addresses and conducts seminars on the future for business, government and not-for-profit organizations. He also facilitates groups in developing scenarios, visions and strategic plans for the future. Bishop's clients include IBM, the NASA Johnson Space Center, Nestlé USA, Tetra Pak, the Shell Pipeline Corporation, the Defense and Central Intelligence Agencies, the Lawrence Livermore National Laboratory, the W.K. Kellogg Foundation, the Texas Department of Transportation, the California Environmental Protection Agency, and the Center for Houston’s Future. He is a founding board member of the Association of Professional Futurists, and is president of his own firm, Strategic Foresight and Development, which offers education and training in futures thinking and techniques to the corporate market.

- Director, Graduate Program in Futures Studies, University of Houston, 2005–2013
- Chair, Graduate Program in Studies of the Future, University of Houston–Clear Lake, 1983–1996, 1998–2005
- Executive Director, Institute for Futures Research, University of Houston–Clear Lake, 1990–2005
- President, Strategic Foresight and Development, 2001–present
- Board Member, Association of Professional Futurists, 2001–2007
- Planning officer, NASA Mid-Continent Technology Transfer Center, 1992–1996
- Founder and Director, Space Business Research Center, 1986–1990
- Founding member, UHCL Research Institute for Computing and Information Sciences, 1985–1992
- Founder and First President, TX Council of Faculty Governance Organizations, 1978–1981
