= Futurist =

Social scientist

Futurists (also known as futurologists, prospectivists, foresight practitioners and horizon scanners) are people whose specialty or interest is future studies or futurology or the attempt to systematically explore predictions and possibilities about the future and how they can emerge from the present, whether that of human society in particular or of life on Earth in general.

== Definition ==
=== Past futurists and the emergence of the term ===
The term "futurist" most commonly refers to people who attempt to understand the future, sometimes called trend analysis. Futurists include authors, consultants, thinkers, organizational leaders and others who engage in interdisciplinary and systems thinking to advise private and public organizations on such matters as diverse global fads and trends, possible scenarios, emerging market opportunities, as well as risk management. A futurist is not an artist in the sense of the art movement futurism.

The Oxford English Dictionary identifies the earliest use of the term futurism in English as 1842, to refer, in a theological context, to the Christian eschatological tendency of that time. The next recorded use is the label adopted by the Italian and Russian Futurists, the artistic, literary and political movements of the 1920s and 1930s which sought to reject the past and fervently embrace speed, technology, and often violent change.

There are a number of organizations that specialize in this field including the World Future Society, the Association of Professional Futurists (APF) and the World Futures Studies Federation (WFSF).

The term futurology in its contemporary sense was first coined in the mid‑1940s by the German Professor Ossip K. Flechtheim, who proposed a new science of probability. Flechtheim argued that even if systematic forecasting did no more than unveil the subset of statistically highly probable processes of change and charted their advance, it would still be of crucial social value.

In the mid‑1940s the first professional "futurist" consulting institutions like RAND and SRI began to engage in long-range planning, systematic trend watching, scenario development, and visioning, at first under World War II military and government contract and, beginning in the 1950s, for private institutions and corporations. The period from the late 1940s to the mid‑1960s laid the conceptual and methodological foundations of the modern futurology field. Bertrand de Jouvenel's The Art of Conjecture in 1963 and Dennis Gabor's Inventing the Future in 1964 are considered key early works, and the first U.S. university course devoted entirely to the future was taught by the late Alvin Toffler at the New School in 1966.

== Modern futurists ==
Economists have defined the forecasting time range, so an explanation can be offered for predicting when an economic event will occur. Economists are in particular concerned about calculating when a recession or economic growth will set in. Futurist writers may not be precise about timing. However, futurists tend to engage in deep analysis about the speed of change. Economic forecasting for 5 to 20 years going forward is the middle-range future. 20 to 50 years from now is the long-range future in economic analysis. Futurists are frequently concerned with the middle- and long-range future, while economic planners working for the public or private sector typically publish on the middle-range future as well as the near-range future, which is 1 to 5 years going forward from the time of publication.

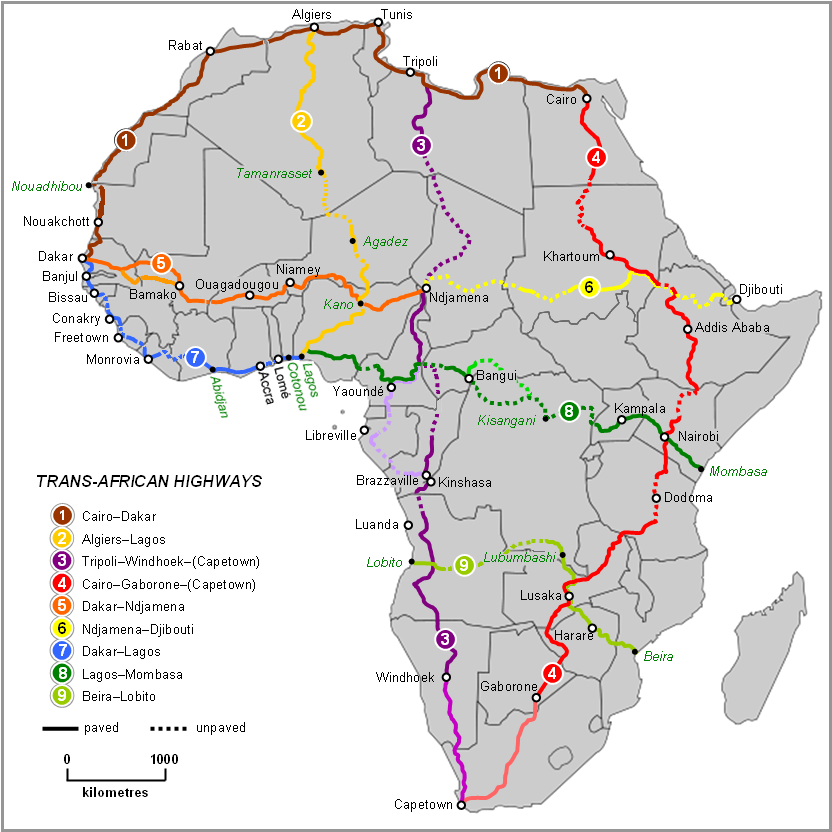
A road map of the Trans-African Highway network

More generally, the label includes such disparate lay, professional, and academic groups as visionaries, foresight consultants, corporate strategists, policy analysts, cultural critics, planners, marketers, forecasters, prediction market developers, roadmappers, operations researchers, investment managers, actuaries, and other risk analyzers, and future-oriented individuals educated in every academic discipline, including anthropology, complexity studies, computer science, economics, engineering, urban design, evolutionary biology, history, management, mathematics, philosophy, physical sciences, political science, psychology, sociology, systems theory, technology studies, trend analysis, and other disciplines.

== Futurology ==
"Futurology"—or "futures studies", futures research, and foresight—can be summarized as being concerned with "three P's and a W", i.e. "possible, probable, and preferable" futures, plus "wildcards", which are low-probability, high-impact events, should they occur. Even with high-profile, probable events, such as the fall of telecommunications costs, the growth of the internet, or the aging demographics of particular countries, there is often significant uncertainty in the rate or continuation of a trend. Thus, a key part of futures analysis is the managing of uncertainty and risk.

== Futurists and futurology ==
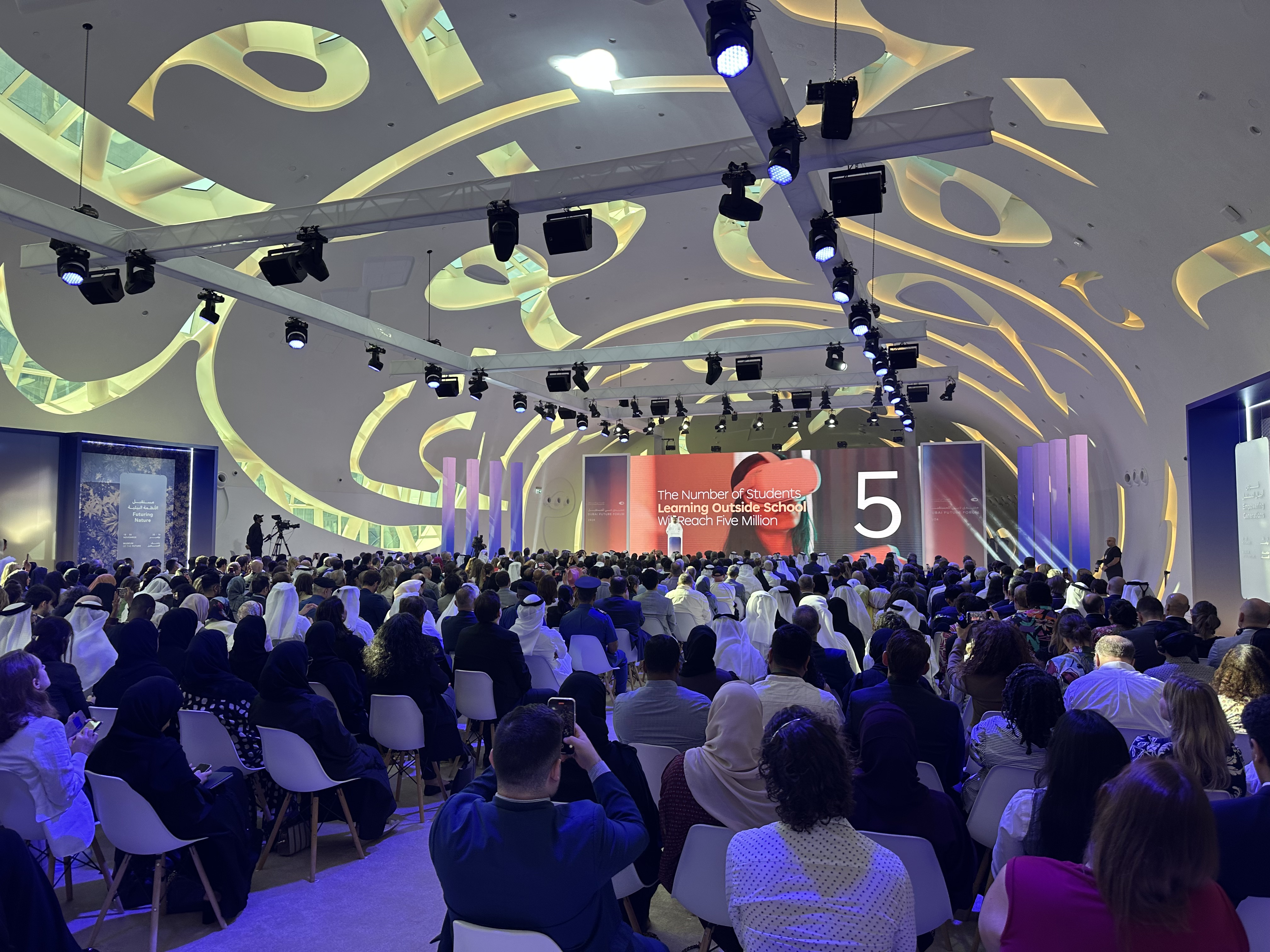
Dubai Future Forum (2024), the largest annual gathering of futurists

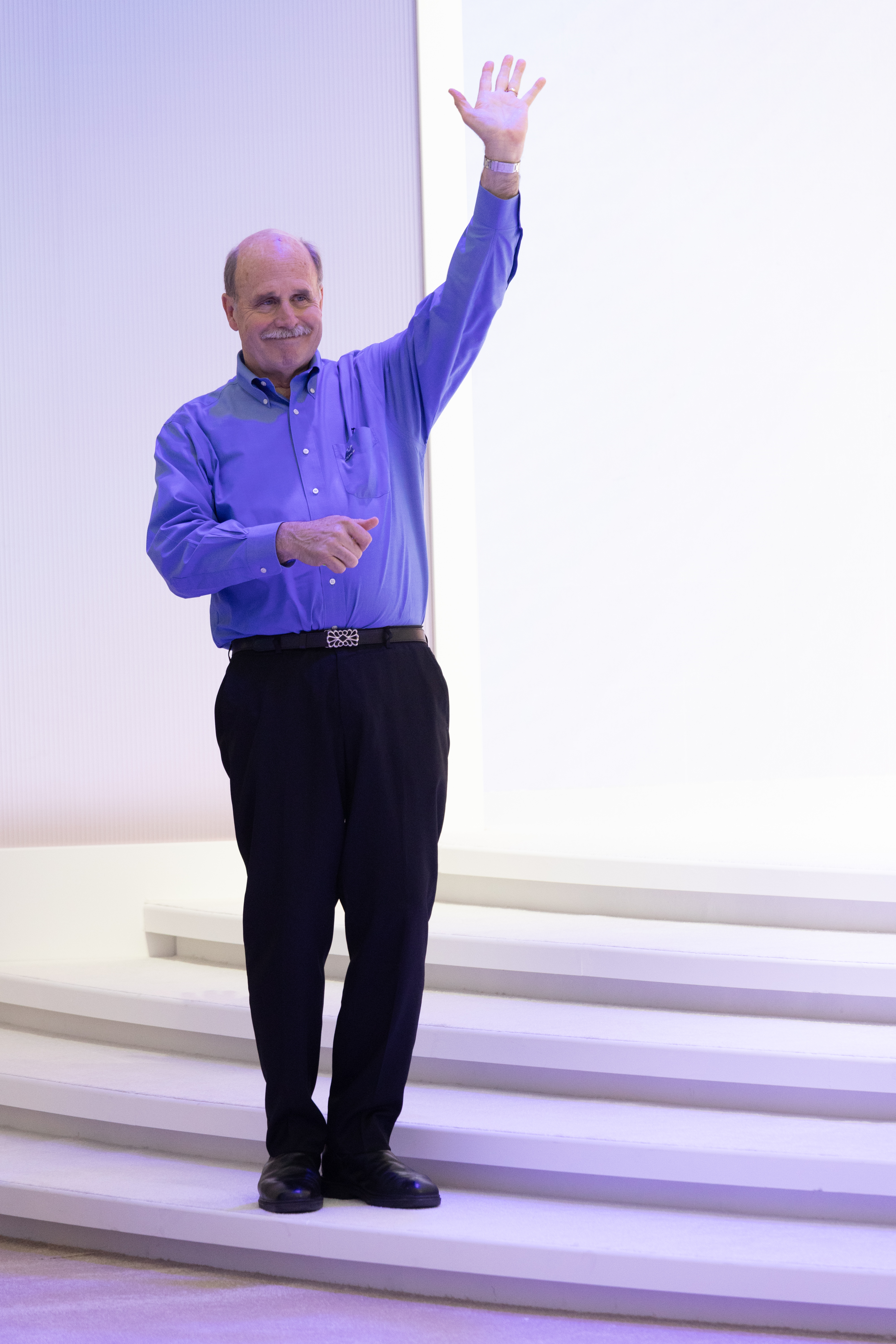
Futurist Paul Saffo

Not all futurists engage in the practice of futurology as generally defined. Futurists who engage in positive science are historically associated with the cult of the Futurism art movement. At the turn of the 20th century Giacomo Balla was thrilled at the prospect of machines rendering many daily aspects of traditional labor obsolete, leaving humans with responsibility only for fragmented and repetitive tasks. Key figures in the Futurism art movement progressed to forge an alliance between artists and scientists. And while religious futurists, astrologers, occultists, New Age diviners, etc. use methodologies that include study, none of their personal revelation or belief-based work would fall within a consensus definition of futurology as used in academics or by futures studies professionals.

John McHale, author of The Future of the Future, published a "Futures Directory", and directed a think tank called The Centre For Integrative Studies at the State University of New York (SUNY) in 1968. Futurists have started consulting groups or earn money as speakers, with examples including Alvin Toffler, John Naisbitt and Patrick Dixon. Frank Feather is a business speaker that presents himself as a pragmatic futurist. Some futurists have commonalities with science fiction while some science-fiction writers, such as Arthur C. Clarke, Alvin Toffler, and Herman Kahn were merely celebrities who nevertheless were used as credible sources by futurists engaging in Up Wing optimism. Science fiction visions therefore provided policymakers with ideas, which were challenged previously by the environmental movement. In the introduction to The Left Hand of Darkness, Ursula K. Le Guin distinguished futurists from novelists, writing of the study as the business of prophets, clairvoyants, and futurists. In her words, "a novelist's business is lying".

A 2001 survey of 108 futurists found the following shared assumptions:

1. We are in the midst of a historical transformation. Current times are not just part of normal history.
2. Multiple perspectives are at the heart of futures studies, including unconventional thinking, internal critique, and cross-cultural comparison.
3. Consideration of alternatives. Futurists do not see themselves as value-free forecasters, but instead aware of multiple possibilities.
4. Participatory futures. Futurists generally see their role as liberating the future in each person, and creating enhanced public ownership of the future. This is true worldwide.
5. Long-term policy transformation. While some are more policy-oriented than others, almost all believe that the work of futures studies is to shape public policy, so it consciously and explicitly takes into account the long term.
6. Part of the process of creating alternative futures and of influencing public (corporate, or international) policy is internal transformation. At international meetings, structural and individual factors are considered equally important.
7. Complexity. Futurists believe that a simple one-dimensional or single-discipline orientation is not satisfactory. Trans-disciplinary approaches that take complexity seriously are necessary. Systems thinking, particularly in its evolutionary dimension, is also crucial.
8. Futurists are motivated by change. They are not content merely to describe or forecast. They desire an active role in world transformation.
9. They are hopeful for a better future as a "strange attractor".
10. Most believe they are pragmatists in this world, even as they imagine and work for another. Futurists have a long term perspective.
11. Sustainable futures, understood as making decisions that do not reduce future options, that include policies on nature, gender, and other accepted paradigms. This applies to corporate futurists and other non-governmental organizations. Environmental sustainability is reconciled with the technological, spiritual, and post-structural ideals. Sustainability is not a "back to nature" ideal, but rather inclusive of technology and culture.

== Other uses ==
The term has also been used to refer to popular electronic music acts who emerged in the late 1970s, such as Orchestral Manoeuvres in the Dark and The Human League.

== See also ==
- Association of Professional Futurists
- Dubai Future Forum
- Institute for the Future
- Transhumanism
- World Future Society
- World Futures Studies Federation
