= ACET =

ACET may refer to:

- ACET (AIDS charity)
- The Ateneo College Entrance Test at the Ateneo de Manila University
