= Edward Trevor (Jersey) =

Jersey politician

Municipality of St Helier, Jersey
- Incumbent
- Assumed office December 2005
- Constituency: St Helier, Jersey
- Majority: unopposed

Personal details
- Born: 5 December 1938 (age 87) Mandeville Place, London, W1
- Spouse(s): Married, Pam
- Children: Zoe (1963), Melanie (1966), Colin (1969)
- Occupation: Retired chartered surveyor

Edward Trevor, MBE (born 5 December 1938) is a British politician.

== Sutton Council ==
Trevor joined Sutton Council in 1966, stepping down in May 2006. He served on most of the Council's committees and chaired several including Planning and Health & Housing.

He was elected mayor in 1979, and from May 2002 until May 2004 he was Leader of the Conservative Opposition.

== Other UK political positions ==
For a time he led the Conservative Housing Group on the Association of Metropolitan Authorities during which time he was chairman of the Greater London House Condition Survey Steering Group. Edward Trevor has also served as a member of the South West Thames Regional Health Authority and as a non-Executive Director of Hammersmith & Queen Charlotte's Special Health Authority.

== Charitable works ==
Trevor has devoted much of his spare time to raising money for charities. After being mayor, he founded the Trevor Fund; the income from this currently funds sport for young people and projects for disabled youngsters. The Fund received most of his member's allowance.

Trevor has also devoted much time to the ASHA Foundation, which works to improve the quality of life of children and adults in India suffering from cerebral palsy; he was particularly involved with its proposal to build a community centre in London for the major world religions. He has been made a Patron of the ASHA Centre which operates from an historic house in Gloucestershire.

He was chairman of the organising committee for the Orthopaedic Research Walks for St Helier Hospital and is now involved with the new South West London Elective Orthopaedic Centre. He has also been President of the Sutton, Cheam and Worcester Park Branch of the Royal National Lifeboat Institution since 1980.

Trevor is vice-chairman of ShopMobility UK, Jersey Disability Partnership and Jersey Arthritis Association. He is Chairman of Shopmobility in Jersey and the Trevor Fund.

== Honours awarded ==
He has been awarded the Silver Medal by the RNLI for his work with the Sutton, Cheam and Worcester Park Branch, of which he has been president since 1980.

He is also president and honorary life member of the carshalton rifle club, of which he was formerly chairman for a period of 17 years.

In June 2004, Edward Trevor was awarded the MBE for his community work in Sutton.

== St Helier Municipality ==
In 2004, he moved to Jersey in the Channel Islands and was elected to the position of Rates Assessor and in 2007 as Chairman of the Association of Jersey Rates Assessors. He founded the Shopmobility scheme for disabled persons in Jersey which now operates from the Sand Street car park and serves both Islanders and visitors. In 2009 he was chairman of the Joint Charities Christmas Appeal.

== Controversy ==
Trevor was embroiled in controversy in November 2009 after ACET collectors alleged that they were harassed by collectors for the Joint Charities Christmas Appeal and that Trevor had called the police to prevent them from collecting. In an interview on BBC Jersey broadcast on 30 November, Trevor was unapologetic, describing ACET as a "so-called charity" and stating that in the Western world "most AIDS sufferers are responsible for their own condition".
