= WFSF =

WFSF may refer to:

- WFSF-LD, a low-power television station (channel 10) licensed to serve Key West, Florida, United States
- World Futures Studies Federation
