= Richard Slaughter =

Dr Richard Slaughter
- Born: Richard Slaughter; Late 1945; London, London
- Education: Lancaster University, PhD. futures studies,1982
- Occupation: Professor/author
- Spouse: Laurie
- Writing career
- Subjects: Futures studies, journalism, Integral perspective, social innovation
- Notable works: Director at Foresight International; Foundation professor at Foresight International published 20 books on futures studies
- Literary movement: Futures studies
- Website: authors-unlimited.org/author/richard-slaughter

Richard Slaughter is a scholar and writer in the field of futures studies, applied foresight and social innovation. He is the co-director of Foresight International, and has guest edited the journals Futures and foresight. His work has centred on developing the theory and practice of futures in education; the transition from empirical to critical futures work; bringing Integral theory into futures, and working with others to stimulate effective responses to what he regards as a "global emergency" created, in part, by the confluence of peak oil and global warming.

In 2009 the special issue of Futures on Integral Futures that was edited by Slaughter was voted one of the "most important futures works of 2008" by the Association of Professional Futurists.

Founded in 1999 at the Swinburne University of Technology, the Australian Foresight Institute was designed as a specialized research and post-graduate teaching unit. A research program on Creating and Sustaining Social Foresight was funded and supported by the Pratt Foundation and produced a series of monographs.

The institute was disestablished in 2005, with the teaching program subsumed into Swinburne University of Technology's Faculty of Business and Enterprise, with the new name of The Strategic Foresight Program.

== Selected works ==
- Birds in Bermuda. Bermuda Bookstores Ltd., Hamilton, Bermuda: ix + 158pp (1975) With photographs by the author.
- Recovering the Future. Grad. School of Environ. Science, Monash University, Melbourne: iv + 189 pp (1988) ISBN 0-86746-667-7
- Studying the Future, Bicentennial Futures Education Project. Commission For the Future, Melbourne: xiv + 82 pp (1989) ISBN 0-642-14281-5
