= Flechtheim =

Flechtheim is a surname. Notable people with the surname include:

- Alfred Flechtheim (1878–1937), Jewish art dealer, art collector, journalist and publisher persecuted by the Nazis
- Ossip K. Flechtheim (1909–1998), German jurist, political scientist, author, futurist, and humanist
