= Technology forecasting =

Predicting the future of technology

Technology forecasting attempts to predict the future characteristics of machines, procedures or techniques. Researchers create technology forecasts based on past experience and current technological developments. Like other forecasts, technology forecasting can help organizations make smart decisions. By analyzing future opportunities and threats, forecasters can improve decisions to achieve maximum benefits.

By analyzing the huge social and economic changes experienced by most countries, government and economic institutions could make plans for future developments. However, not all historical data can be used for technology forecasting, as forecasters also need to adopt advanced technology and quantitative modeling from experts' research and conclusions.

== History ==
Technology forecasting has existed more than a century, but it developed to an established subject until World War II, because American government started to detect the technology development trend related to military area after the war. In 1945, the U.S. Army Air Forces created a report called Toward New Horizons, which surveyed the technology development and discussed the importance for future studies. The report is an indication for the beginning of modern technology forecasting.

In the 1950s and 1960s, RAND Corporation developed the Delphi Technique and were widely accepted and used to make smart evaluation for the future. The applications of Delphi Technique are a turning point in the history of technology forecasting, because it became an efficient tool for knowledge building and decision-making, especially for social policy and public health issues.

In the 1970s, private sector and government agencies out of military area widely adopted technology forecasting and helped to diversify the users and applications. As the developments of computing technology, advanced computer hardware and software facilitates the process of data sorting and data analysis. The development of Internet and networking is also beneficial for the data access and data transfer. Technology opportunities analysis started since 1990. Improved software can help analysts search and retrieve data information from large complicated database and then graphically represents interrelations.

From 2000, more and more new requirements and challenges lead to the modern development of technology forecasting, such as alternate reality games, online forecasting communities and obsolescence forecasting.

== Important aspects ==
"I think we have a cultural affinity for technology that reflects optimism, but we all make poor forecasts." — Jim Moore, director of the Transportation Engineering Program at the University of Southern California

Primarily, a technological forecast deals with the characteristics of technology, such as levels of technical performance, like speed of a military aircraft, the power in watts of a particular future engine, the accuracy or precision of a measuring instrument, the number of transistors in a chip in the year 2015, etc. The forecast does not have to state how these characteristics will be achieved.

Secondly, technological forecasting usually deals with only useful machines, procedures or techniques. This is to exclude from the domain of technological forecasting those commodities, services or techniques intended for luxury or amusement.

Thirdly, feasibility is a key element in technology forecasting. Forecasters should consider the cost and the level of difficulty of materialization of desires. For example, a computer-based approach “Pattern” is an expensive forecasting method which is not recommended to be used in cases of restricted funds.

== Methods ==
Commonly adopted methods and tools of technology forecasting include the Moore's law, Write's law and Goddard law, which generate quantitative assessments for technology progress, the Delphi method, forecast by analogy, growth curves, extrapolation and horizon scanning. Normative methods of technology forecasting—like the relevance trees, morphological models, and mission flow diagrams—are also commonly used. Delphi method is widely used in technology forecasts because of its flexibility and convenience. However, the requirement on reaching consensus is a possible disadvantage of Delphi method. Extrapolation can work well with enough effective historical data. By analyzing the past data, forecaster extend the past development tendency in order to extrapolate meaningful outcomes in the future.

Several technology forecasting methods base their prediction on the interaction between markets and technologies. While technology progress enables firms to launch improved or new products, potential market provides the incentives for R&D investments and market success provides the funding for further R&D.

=== Combining forecasts ===
Studies of past forecasts have shown that one of the most frequent reasons why a forecast goes wrong is that the forecaster ignores related fields. A given technical approach may fail to achieve the level of capability forecast for it, because it is superseded by another technical approach which the forecaster ignored. Another problem is that of inconsistency between forecasts. The inconsistency between forecasts reflects on the different locations and time used on controlled experiment. It usually produces inaccurate and unreliable data which leads to incorrect insight and faulty predictions. Because of these problems, it is often necessary to combine forecasts of different technologies. In addition, the use of more than one forecasting method often gives the forecaster more insight into the processes at work which are responsible for the growth of the technology being forecast. Combining forecasts can reduce errors compared with a singular forecast.

== Relative researches and applications ==
=== Forecasting institutes ===
- Singularity Institute for Artificial Intelligence
- Future of Humanity Institute
- The Millennium Project
- Institute for the Future

=== Scientific Journals ===
- Technological Forecasting and Social Change
- Futures
- Futures & Foresight Science
- Foresight
- Journal of Futures Studies

=== Uses in manufacturing ===
Technology forecasting heavily relies on data and data makes contributions to manufacturing and Industry 4.0. IoT System provides a strong platform to make predictive analysis in the post-Industry 4.0. The advanced technologies will increase forecasting accuracy as well as reliability. As the rapid development of IoT technology, more and more industries will be equipped with sensors and monitors. The emergence of modern manufacturing changes the appearances of factories. IoT system helps managers to monitor and control the production process by collecting, tracking and transferring data. Data is powerful. Managers also can do business analysis based on marketing data. Information such as customer buying preference and market demanding could be collected and used for production estimation.

Trend analysis based on current growth assumption could be used in manufacturing. The analysis strongly helps the cycle time reduction of manufacturing process and energy consumption. In this case, modern technology increases production efficiency as well as economic efficiency.

=== Technology forecasting with technology radar ===
Companies often use technology forecasting to prioritize R&D activities, plan new product development and make strategic decisions on technology licensing, and formation of joint ventures. One of the instruments enabling technology forecasting in a company is a technology radar. Technology radar serves to identify technologies, trends and shocks early on and to raise attention to the threats and opportunities of technological development as well as to stimulate innovation.

Technology radars have successfully been implemented for the purpose of identifying, selecting, assessing and disseminating a company-wide technology intelligence. These Technology Radars follow a certain radar process which itself brings significant value for a company:

- Identification: employees acting as technology scouts from all over the world submit novel technologies to the platform.
- Selection: based on the technology, its potential impact and novelty, a radar team revises submitted technologies and selects the most valid ones.
- Assessment: selected technologies are then assessed on the basis of market opportunity and implementation risk.
- Dissemination: radar displays assessed technologies according to maturity, position in the value chain, and relevance.

== See also ==
- Accelerating change – Increase in the rate of technological change through history
- Delphi method – Interactive forecasting method
- Forecasting – Making predictions with available data
- Futurology – Study of postulating possible, probable, and preferable futures
- Horizon scanning – Methodology in futures studies
- List of emerging technologies – New technologies actively in development
- Optimism bias – Type of cognitive bias
- Reference class forecasting – Method of predicting the future
- Strategic foresight – Planning-oriented discipline
- Technology scouting – Element of technology management
- Technology roadmap – Planning technique
