= Three Horizons =

Method in futures studies

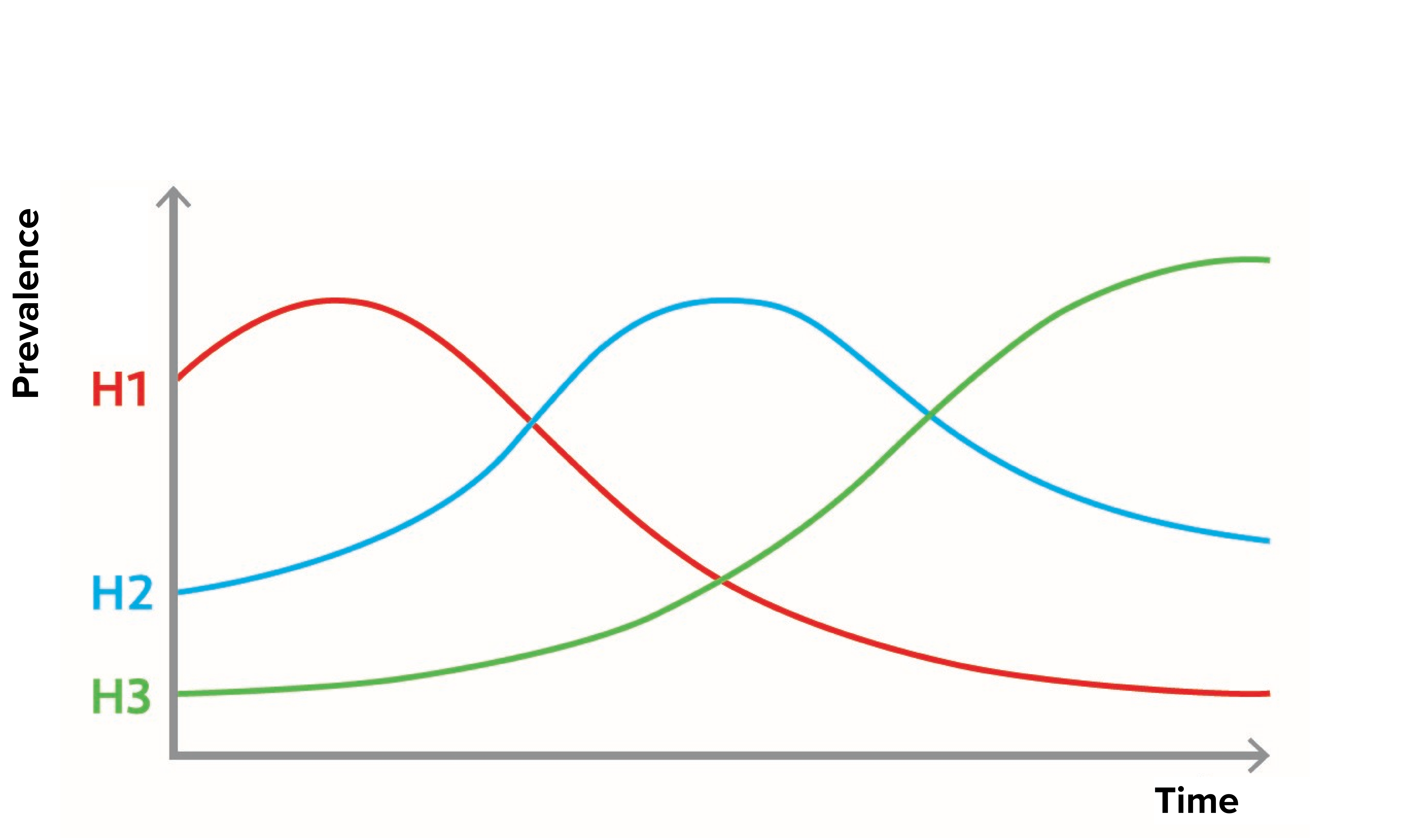
The Three Horizons framework.

Three Horizons (or 3H) is a framework and method for futures studies and practice, created and developed by Anthony Hodgson, Andrew Curry, Graham Leicester, Bill Sharpe, Andrew Lyon and Ioan Fazey. It presents a picture of change in a given system as an interplay of three horizons. Horizon 1 (H1) is the currently dominant but failing system that declines over time as it loses its fit with a changing environment. Horizon 3 (H3) is the envisioned desired future that is aligned to the changing environment. Horizon 2 (H2) is a turbulent intermediate space of innovations, some of which are 'captured' by H1, prop it up and extend its lifespan (so-called 'H2-' innovations), and some of which are genuinely disruptive and create space for a radically different kind of system to emerge ('H2+' innovations). The framework also illustrates the existence of 'pockets of the future in the present': niche examples of actors and systems working in a radically different way to the mainstream, which already embody H3 values. In addition, some aspects of H1 will remain valuable in the desired future.

3H is commonly used in workshop settings to help organisations and actors create strategies for transformational change (i.e. fundamental change that shifts underlying values and worldviews, rather than more superficial kinds of change), often in order to adapt to wider trends and crises.

== History ==
3H was created in 2006 from an adaptation of McKinsey & Company's 'three horizons of growth' framework. A paper describing the 3H framework in detail was published in 2016 in the journal Ecology & Society.

== Use examples ==
3H has been used by various organisations around the world, including the United Nations Development Programme, UNICEF. Impact Amplified lists 3H use examples in its 'Three Horizons Use Case Library'.

Contexts in which 3H has been used include:

- '[Engaging] young people from around the world in a foresight process to identify and support youth-led climate breakthroughs'
- Identifying priority domains of action for transforming towards a regenerative food system in Yorkshire
- Exploring desired urban futures in a number of cities around the world
- Identifying actions to increase coastal community resilience against environmental shocks in Valiathura, India
- Drawing on local ecological knowledge to identify adaptation pathways to reduce wildfire risk in Montseny, Catalonia
- Exploring the future of sport and recreation in New Zealand
- Exploring the future of geoscience
