= Future workshop =

The future workshop is a futures technique developed by Robert Jungk, Ruediger Lutz and Norbert R. Muellert in the 1970s. It enables a group of people to develop new ideas or solutions of social problems. A future workshop is particularly suitable for participants who have little experience with processes of creative decision making, for example children or youth. However it is a useful method for any kind of complex problem that requires many stakeholders' involvement. The future workshop method requires an intensive preparation and support by trained moderators. It is used in spatial planning to involve citizens in the planning process, in software engineering to create a common vision of the future, and in health care to solve complex and multifaceted problems.

The method is similar to Open Space Technology, Future Search, BarCamp or Unconferences.

Future workshop may also be used as a kind of action research method.

== Phases ==
1. Preparation phase: The method, its rules and the scheduled course of the workshop (in accordance with the participants) is introduced.
2. Critique phase: The problem is investigated critically and thoroughly. First of all, a visualised brainstorming is performed and a general and critical question concerning the problem is framed.
3. Fantasy or visionary phase: All participants try to work out a vision of the future, to draw a picture of future possibilities.
4. Implementation phase: The ideas found are checked and evaluated with regard to their practicability. Discussions are related to the first step in order to achieve the vision.
