= Journal of Futures Studies =

- Discipline: futures studies
- Language: English
- Edited by: Sohail Inayatullah, Jian-Bang Deng

Publication details
- History: November 1996-present
- Publisher: Tamkang University Press on behalf of Graduate Institute of Futures Studies, Tamkang University, Tamsui, Taipei (Taiwan)
- Frequency: Quarterly

Standard abbreviations
- ISO 4: J. Futures Stud.

Indexing
- ISSN: 1027-6084
- OCLC no.: 190845334

Links
- Journal homepage; Online archive

The Journal of Futures Studies (JFS) is a quarterly peer-reviewed academic journal in the discipline of futures studies. It is published by Tamkang University Press on behalf of the Graduate Institute of Futures Studies at Tamkang University in Tamsui, Taipei, in Taiwan. The journal is published quarterly, in the months of February, May, August, and November.

== History ==
JFS was first published in November 1996. Its publication history can be divided into the following periods:

- November 1996-May 2000 (first four volumes): The journal was published twice a year, in November and May respectively, and each volume of the journal contained one year's November issue and the next year's May issue.
- August 2000 – present: The journal has been published quarterly, with a given volume featuring the issues from August and November of one year and February and May of the next year.

== Reception and popularity ==
The SCImago Journal Rank database says that the h-index of the journal (restricted to years of coverage 2005–2012) is 7 and the impact factor is about 0.25.

== See also ==
- Technological Forecasting and Social Change
- Futures
- Futures & Foresight Science
- Foresight
- European Journal of Futures Research
