= Jim Dator =

American futurologist (born 1933)

James Allen Dator (born 1933) is an American futurologist and a former professor and Director of the Hawaii Research Center for Futures Studies in the department of political science and college of social sciences at the University of Hawaii at Manoa. He has written on four futures archetypes which represent four alternative scenarios (Continuation, Limits & Discipline, Decline & Collapse, Transformation). Since retiring, he advises and collaborates with the UK-based School of International Futures (SOIF).
