= Ossip K. Flechtheim =

Ossip Kurt Flechtheim (March 5, 1909 – March 4, 1998) was a German jurist, political scientist, author, futurist, and a humanist. He is credited with coining of the term "Futurology".

== Early life ==
Flechtheim was born in Nikolaev (then Russian Empire, now Mykolaiv, Ukraine), into a Jewish family, the son of bookseller Herrmann Flechtheim (1880–1960) and his wife Olga, née Farber (1884–1964). In 1910 the family moved back into the father's hometown of Westphalian Münster, where his relatives had a grain trade business, and later to Düsseldorf. The art dealer Alfred Flechtheim was his uncle.

His family being secular, Flechtheim did not receive religious upbringing. In later life (after Second World War in West Berlin) he became a member (as a non-denominational humanist) of the German Freethinkers Association (later Humanist Association of Germany).

After graduating from the Hindenburg School (now Humboldt-Gymnasium Düsseldorf) in 1927, he became a member of KPD which he left after five years, following a trip to Moscow (his mother's native city) in 1931, and having begun to detest the ideological narrowness of the movement. Flechtheim studied law and political science at the universities in Freiburg, Paris, Heidelberg, Berlin, and finally Cologne. From 1931 to 1933 he completed his legal clerkship at the Higher Regional Court of Düsseldorf. He was awarded his Doctorate in Law in 1934 for his work on Hegel's criminal theory, while studying in Cologne under Carl Schmitt.

== Emigration and academic career in United States ==
After Nazi takeover of power in 1933, Flechtheim was dismissed from civil service as being Jewish and a member of Neu Beginnen. In 1935 he was jailed for a total of 22 days. He emigrated to Belgium and then to Switzerland, where he was awarded a scholarship to continue his studies at the Graduate Institute of International Studies (HEI) affiliated with the University of Geneva, where he graduated in 1939 (University of Cologne stripped him of his degree in 1938).

In 1939 he established contacts with Institute for Social Research in Geneva, and then emigrated to the United States, having accepted the fellowship offered by Max Horkheimer, the director of the Institute, when it was relocated to Columbia University in New York City. There he met Erich Fromm, Herbert Marcuse, and also became acquainted with Isaac Asimov. In December 1942, he married Lili Therese Factor, the daughter of Emil Faktor, the former chief editor of the Berliner Börsen-Courier, their daughter Marion Ruth was born on September 26, 1946. Flechtheim taught at Atlanta University, a Historically Black College, in Atlanta, Georgia, until 1943, and afterwards accepted a position an assistant professor at the Bates College.

During the Second World War Flechtheim joined the US Army. In 1946 he returned to service in a rank of lieutenant colonel, joining for several months the Office of the US Chief of Counsel for War Crimes in Germany. From 1947 to 1951 he continued his academic career in the United States as a university lecturer.

== Return to Germany and participation in politics ==
In 1947 University of Heidelberg awarded Flechtheim a doctorate for his work (published in 1948) on KPD in Weimar Republic. He applied for the reinstatement of his law degree from Cologne University, which was also granted in 1947. From 1952 to 1959 Flechtheim was a full professor at the German University of Politics. After the integration of that institution into the Free University of Berlin in 1959, he became a professor of political science at the local Otto-Suhr-Institut, the position he held until his retirement in 1974.

In political life, Flechtheim became a co-founder of the liberal-left Republican Club in West Berlin, remaining a member of Social Democratic Party of Germany for ten years until 1962, and becoming member of the Greens in 1981. He has published a variety of books, essays, and articles in newspapers (including Frankfurter Rundschau and Die Zeit). Flechtheim was a founding member and vice president of German chapter of the International Federation for Human Rights, a member of the PEN Club, the council of peace studies and the Board of Trustees of the German Society for Peace and Conflict Studies. Flechtheim was an active supporter of the International War Resisters. On August 9, 1985, in interview for Frankfurter Allgemeine Zeitung he commented on what he detested the most: "inhumanity" and the war of the people against each other. Following the German reunification Flechtheim was one of the few that argued in favour of "third way" of synthesis of both Western and Eastern position on a basis of "democratic socialism".

Flechtheim died on the eve of his 89th birthday in his adopted hometown of Berlin, and was buried in Dahlem Cemetery plot 2, next to some of his political friends interred there.

== Futurology ==
The founding father of modern futurism, if there is one, may well be a mild-mannered German professor who, as early as the mid-1940s, began speaking and writing about the need for what he termed "futurology."... Flechtheim argued that universities ought to teach about the future. In this essay, he refers to "futurology" as a new "science." Even if systematic forecasting did no more than unveil the inevitable, he asserts, it would still be of crucial value.

—Alvin Toffler in his book The Futurists (1972)

In 1943 Flechtheim coined the term "Futurology" as a systematic and critical treatment of problematic related to Future studies. In his 1945 publication Teaching the Future he called for the development of courses dealing with the future. In his 1969 essay Discussion on Future Research he explained that it "... was the attempt to discuss the evolution of man and his society in the hitherto forbidden future tense. I held that, by marshaling the ever growing resources of science and scholarship, we could do more than employ retrospective analysis and hypothetical predictions; we could try to establish the degree of credibility and probability of forecasts."

In 1970 he published his work Futurology: The battle for the future. In it he criticized both the future studies in the West, and the technocratic approach promoted in the socialist countries, instead promoting a model of the "liberation of the future." Flechtheim's concept of futurology around that time was based on the process of social evolution that was emerging in Eastern and Western Europe, leading a "Third Road" beyond capitalist and communist systems and would mean a new democratic alternative to existing societies.

== Selected works ==
- Bolshevist and national socialist doctrines of international law, New York: Social Research, 1940
- Teaching the Future, Journal for Higher Education, 16 (1945), 460-65, and in: Forum, 104 (1945), 307-11
- Fundamentals of Political Science, New York: Ronald Press, 1952
- History and Futurology, Meisenheim am Glan: Anton Hain, 1966
- Discussion on Future Research, in: Robert Jungk and Johan Galtung (Eds.), Mankind 2000, Oslo: Universitetsforlaget, and London: Allen & Unwin, 1969
- The German Left Since 1945 (with William D. Graf), Oleander Press, 1976, ISBN 978-0902675544
- Futurologie. Der Kampf um die Zukunft, Köln: Wiss. u. Pol., 1982, ISBN 978-3804684157

== See also ==
- Julius Abegg – German criminalist (1796–1868)
- Elements of the Philosophy of Right – 1820 work by G. W. F. Hegel
