= European Journal of Futures Research =

- Discipline: Futures studies
- Language: English
- Edited by: Gerhard de Haan

Publication details
- History: 2013-present
- Publisher: Springer Science+Business Media
- Frequency: Continuous
- Open access: Yes
- License: Creative Commons Attribution 4.0 International License
- Impact factor: 0.625 (2018)

Standard abbreviations
- ISO 4: Eur. J. Futures Res.

Indexing
- ISSN: 2195-2248
- LCCN: 2015260069
- OCLC no.: 861973896

Links
- Journal homepage; Online archive

The European Journal of Futures Research is an open access academic journal published by Springer Science+Business Media covering futures studies. It was established in 2013 and the editor-in-chief is Gerhard de Haan (Free University of Berlin).

== Abstracting and indexing ==
The journal is abstracted and indexed in EBSCO databases, International Bibliography of Periodical Literature, ProQuest databases, Scopus, and the Social Sciences Citation Index. According to the Journal Citation Reports, the journal has a 2018 impact factor of 0.625.
