= World Future Society =

Society of futurists

The World Future Society (WFS), founded in 1966, is an international community of futurists and future thinkers.

== History ==
Prominent members and contributors have included Ray Kurzweil, Peter Drucker, Carl Sagan, and Neil deGrasse Tyson.

== Leadership ==
=== Current board chair & CEO ===
Julie Friedman Steele: 2016–Present

=== Past presidents and executive directors ===
Amy Zalman: 2014–2016

Timothy Mack, Esq.: 2004–2014

Edward Cornish: 1966–2004

== Publications ==
=== The Futurist magazine ===
The Futurist magazine was established in 1967, with Edward Cornish serving as the founding editor. From 1967 to 2015, it was a full-color bi-monthly magazine. Today, it is an online publication that reports on technological, societal, and public policy trends, along with topics related to the future of human purpose. The Futurist was nominated for a 2007 Utne Independent Press Award for Best Science and Technology Coverage.

=== World Future Review academic journal ===
The World Future Society previously published the academic journal World Future Review. This journal was published independent from the World Future Society starting with Volume 8.
