= Patrick Dixon =

British business consultant (born 1957)

Patrick Dixon MBE
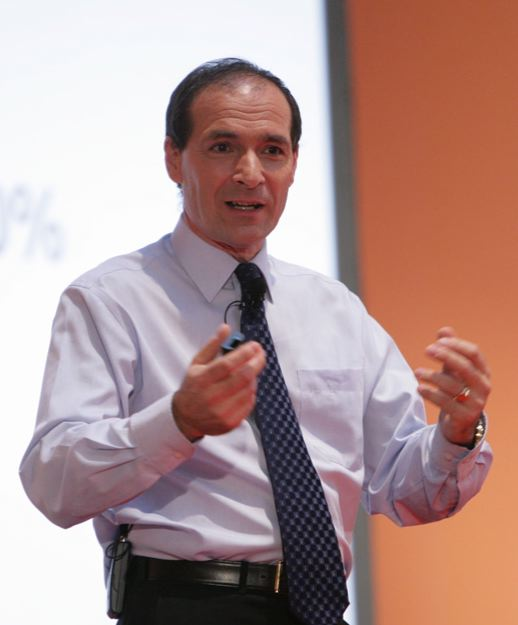
- Born: 1957 (age 68–69); London
- Occupation: Consultant
- Spouse: Sheila
- Children: 4

Patrick Dixon MBE (born 1957) is an author and business consultant, often described as a futurist, and chairman of the trends forecasting company Global Change Ltd. He has been ranked as one of the world’s 20 most influential management thinkers alive today. (Thinkers50 2005). He is also founder of the AIDS charity ACET.

Dixon was appointed Member of the Order of the British Empire (MBE) in the 2024 Birthday Honours for services to HIV and AIDS Care.

== Education and career ==
Patrick Dixon studied Medical Sciences at King's College, Cambridge and continued medical training at Charing Cross Hospital, London. In 1978, while a medical student, he founded the IT startup Medicom, selling medical software solutions in the UK and the Middle East, based on early personal computers.

After qualifying as a physician, he worked for cancer patient at St Joseph's Hospice in London and then as part of the Community Care Team based at University College Hospital while also continuing IT consulting part-time.

In 1988 he launched the Church-based AIDS charity ACET, following the publication of his first book The Truth about AIDS, which warned of an unfolding catastrophe that has since hit many nations in sub-Saharan Africa. ACET grew rapidly, providing home care services across London and other parts of the UK, and a national sex/lifeskills education programme in schools which has reached more than 450,000 students and is now a network of Independent national programmes providing lifeskills education in schools, health education relating to HIV prevention, and care for those affected by HIV / AIDS, active in 13 countries in Europe, Africa, and Asia.

He was included in the Independent on Sunday's 2010 "Happy List", regarding ACET and his other work tackling the stigma of AIDS.

Dixon has held several non-executive and leadership roles in various organizations. From October 2020 to October 2022, he served as a non-executive director of Mace Group Ltd, a global construction and consultancy company operating in over 70 countries. Between September 2012 and September 2015, Dixon was a non-executive board member of Allied Healthcare Group Ltd, a provider of home care, general practice, and dental services in the UK. He was chairman of the board at Virttu Biologics Ltd from May 2013 to May 2015.

=== Writing work ===
Dixon is also an accomplished author, having published 18 books exploring global trends, business strategy, technology, health, sustainability, government and geopolitics, leadership, management, motivation, relationships, ethics and spirituality. Among his recent works is How AI Will Change Your Life (2024), where he examines artificial intelligence’s impact on society, business, and ethics. The book offers a balanced business perspective on AI’s promises and pitfalls, discussing issues such as surveillance, intellectual freedom, and the socioeconomic implications of automation.

In addition, Dixon co-authored Salt in the Blood with his wife Sheila, chronicling their global sailing voyage aboard their yacht Moxie from 2018 to 2024.

Dixon is also the co-author of SustainAgility, published by Kogan Page, which addresses themes related to sustainability and business adaptability.

He has been ranked as one of the world’s 20 most influential management thinkers alive today. (Thinkers50 2005).

== Personal life ==
Dixon lives in Weymouth, Dorset and is married to Sheila. He has four grown-up children, including Paul Dixon.

== Works ==
Patrick Dixon publishes video messages on his web TV site. He claims over 15 million viewers, and YouTube shows over 5 million video views on his channel there.

=== Books ===
The Thinkers 50 noted Dixon's relaxed attitude to his own intellectual capital, in that he makes much of it available from the Global Change website without charge.

- The Truth about AIDS – Kingsway / ACET International Alliance 1987, 1989, 1994, new edition 2004
- AIDS and Young People – Kingsway 1989
- AIDS and You – Kingsway / ACET Int. All. 1990, 2004
- The Genetic Revolution – Kingsway 1993, 1995
- The Rising Price of Love – Kingsway 1994
- Signs of Revival – Kingsway 1994, 1995
- Out of the Ghetto – Word 1995
- The Truth about Westminster – Kingsway 1995
- The Truth about Drugs – Hodder 1996
- Cyberchurch – Kingsway 1996
- Futurewise – HarperCollins 1998, 2001, Profile Books 2003, reprinted 2004, 2005, 4th edition 2007
- Island of Bolay – HarperCollins 2000 – thriller
- Building a Better Business – Profile Books 2005
- Sustainagility – Kogan Page 2010
- The future of almost (Almost) Everything - Profile Books 2015
- Salt in the Blood: Two Philosophers Go to Sea – Bloomsbury 2021
- How AI will change your life - Profile Books 2024

=== Selected articles ===
- Wake up to stronger tribes and a longer life – Financial Times
