= Foresight (futures studies journal) =

- Discipline: Futures studies
- Language: English
- Edited by: Ozcan Saritas

Publication details
- History: 1999-present
- Publisher: Emerald Publishing Group (international)
- Frequency: Bimonthly

Standard abbreviations
- ISO 4: Foresight (Camb.)

Indexing
- ISSN: 1463-6689 (print); 1465-9832 (web)
- OCLC no.: 782900102

Links
- Journal homepage; Online archive

Foresight: The Journal of Futures Studies, Strategic Thinking and Policy is an international bi-monthly journal published by the Emerald Publishing Group. The name connotes the term "foresight" as it is used in futures studies. Established in 1999, the journal provides a powerful framework and set of techniques that allow for understanding trends and drivers shaping the world, exploring alternative futures, setting priorities and formulating strategies for action. Foresight is a valuable source for futurists and foresight practitioners who should be at the forefront of discovering practical ways to manage 21st century life under growing complexity with a long-term perspective. The journal offers a much-needed forum for sound thinking about the future and socio-technological innovations, and focuses on themes and issues shaping the future, new quantitative and qualitative methods, as well as case studies with novel approaches. The journal is edited by Prof.Dr. Ozcan Saritas since 2009 (Head of Laboratory for Science and Technology Studies, National Research University Higher School of Economics & Honorary Professor, Manchester Institute of Innovation Research, The University of Manchester).

Foresight is indexed in Web of Science (WoS) Emerging Sources Citation Index (ESCI) Scopus ABI/INFORM Academic Research Library EconLit (American Economic Association) Future Survey (World Futures Society) INSPEC Political Science Abstracts (IFI) ProQuest Research Library AIDEA (Italy) Chartered Association of Business Schools (CABS, UK) Academic Journal Guide

== Related journals ==
- Technological Forecasting and Social Change
- Futures & Foresight Science
- Journal of Futures Studies
- Futures
- European Journal of Futures Research
