= World Futures Studies Federation =

UNESCO: Futures Forecasting Decision Support Systems Thinking

The World Futures Studies Federation is a global non-governmental organization that was founded in 1973 to promote the development of futures studies as an academic discipline. Its current president is Jan Berger, Germany.

== History ==
The Federation was chartered at the 1973 meeting of the International Futures Research Conference.

Past organization president Eleonora Barbieri Masini said in 2005: "The vision of the Federation is just as valid today as it was when the Federation started. It can still perform the role of a modest bridge between people who are concerned with building a humane world."

== Relationship with UNESCO ==
UNESCO financed the participation of nationals of developing countries in the events organized by the WFSF until the end of the 1990s. Subsequently, UNESCO supported the organization of Introductory Courses in Futures Studies in the Asia Pacific Region, e.g. Fiji Islands in 1993; the Philippines in 1994. This was followed by funding for futures studies courses held in Budapest in 1999, 2001, 2003, and 2005.

== Partnerships ==
The World Futures Studies Federation has partnerships with institutions like Prince Mohammad bin Fahd University (PMU) in Saudi Arabia, University of Hawaii, Turku School of Economics and RMIT University Global Cities Research Institute, Melbourne as well as other international groups like Club of Rome. The WFSF also is a partner to the European Journal of Futures Research, EJFS.
