= Technological Forecasting and Social Change =

- Discipline: Futures studies, technology forecasting, technology assessment
- Language: English
- Edited by: Scott Cunningham, Mei-Chih Hu

Publication details
- Former name(s): Technological Forecasting
- History: 1969-present
- Publisher: Elsevier
- Impact factor: 12.0 (2022)

Standard abbreviations
- ISO 4: Technol. Forecast. Soc. Change

Indexing
- ISSN: 0040-1625
- OCLC no.: 39284265

Links
- Journal homepage; Online archive

Technological Forecasting and Social Change (formerly Technological Forecasting) is a peer-reviewed academic journal published by Elsevier covering futures studies, technology assessment, and technology forecasting. Articles focus on methodology and actual practice, and have been published since 1969.

The editors-in-chief are Mei-Chih Hu (National Tsing Hua University) and Luca Mora Edinburgh Napier University. According to the Journal Citation Reports, the journal has a 2022 impact factor of 12.0.
