= Futures (journal) =

- Discipline: Futures studies
- Language: English
- Edited by: Patrick van der Duin, Chris Groves

Publication details
- History: 1968–present
- Publisher: Elsevier
- Frequency: 10/year
- Impact factor: 3.0 (2022)

Standard abbreviations
- ISO 4: Futures

Indexing
- ISSN: 0016-3287

Links
- Journal homepage; Online archive

Futures is a peer-reviewed academic journal covering futures studies. It is published by Elsevier. The editors-in-chief are Patrick van der Duin (Foresight & Innovation Management) and Chris Groves (Swansea University).

It is one of the journals that in the 1970s contributed to creating a debate on the topics of sustainable development.
