= Heiko Andreas von der Gracht =

German academic (born 1978)

Heiko von der Gracht
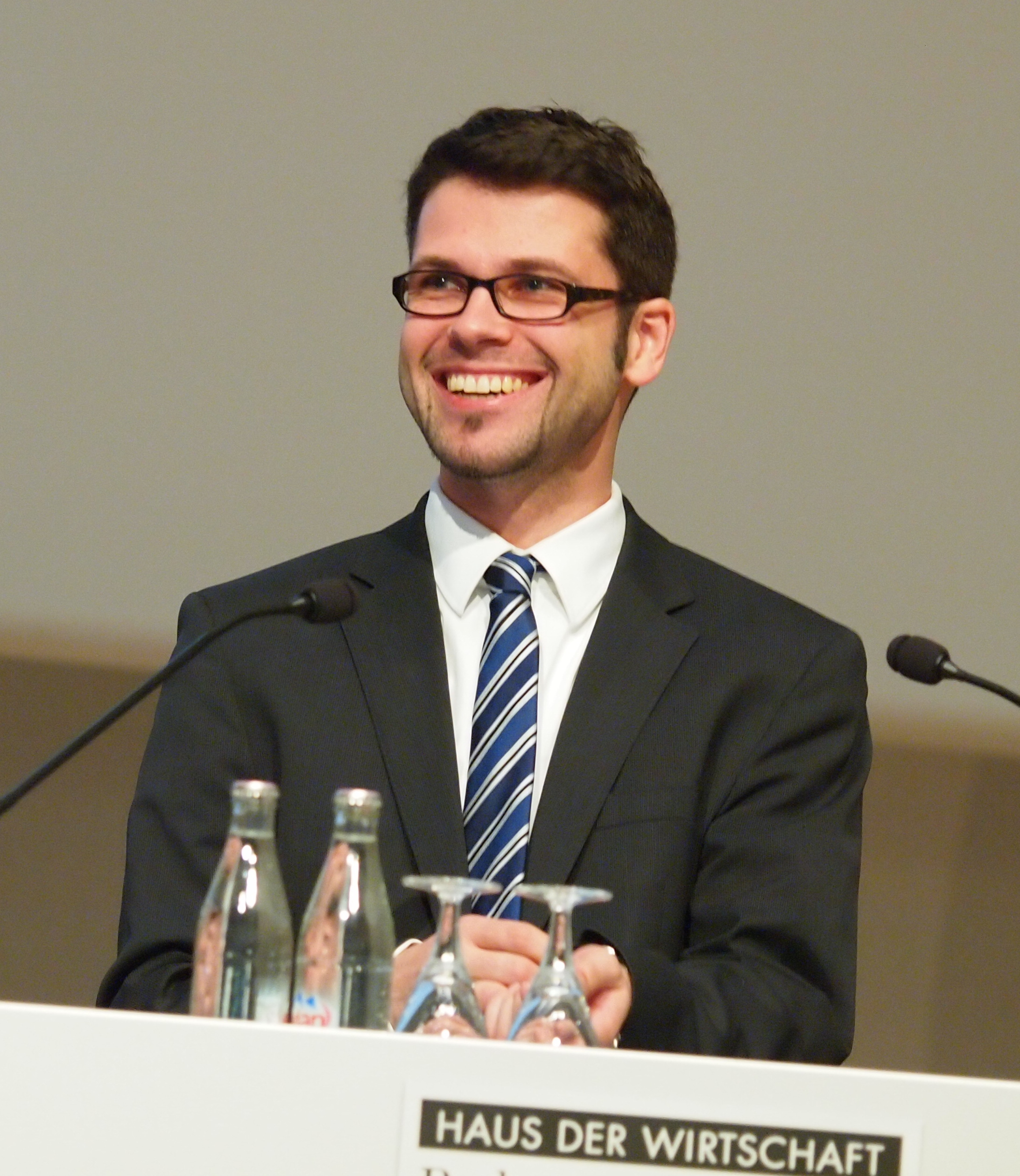
- von der Gracht in 2011
- Born: Heiko Andreas von der Gracht; 30 November 1978 (age 47); Aachen, West Germany
- Education: Niederrhein University of Applied Sciences; Fontys University of Applied Sciences; University of Plymouth; EBS Universität für Wirtschaft und Recht
- Employers: KPMG; University for Continuing Education Krems
- Known for: Foresight; Technology management; Delphi method

Heiko Andreas von der Gracht (born 30 November 1978) is a German academic and futurist specializing in foresight and technology management. He is a professor of foresight and digital transformation at the University for Continuing Education Krems.

== Early life and education ==
Von der Gracht was born in Aachen on 30 November 1978. He was raised in Jülich and attended the Gymnasium Zitadelle Jülich, where he received his Abitur in 1998.

In 2003, he graduated with a degree in Industrial engineering from a dual degree program offered by the Niederrhein University of Applied Sciences, and Fontys University of Applied Sciences in Venlo .

The following year, Von der Gracht received a Master of Science in supply chain management from the University of Plymouth. From 2005 to 2008, he was a research assistant at the EBS University of Business and Law, where he completed his doctorate in 2008 in futures studies.

== Professional life ==
In 2009, Von der Gracht founded the Centre for Futures Studies and Knowledge Management at the EBS University of Business and Law.

In 2013, Von der Gracht joined KPMG Germany as a researcher and head of a think tank for strategic foresight.

Von der Gracht received his habilitation in 2017 from the University of Erlangen–Nuremberg. Since 2024, he has been Professor of Foresight and Digital Transformation at the University for Continuing Education Krems. Previously, Von der Gracht held the Chair of Futures Studies at Steinbeis University.

He also serves as a member of the Global Foresight Network at the World Economic Forum (WEF) and as an ambassador for its Global Collaboration Village (Forum Metaverse).

== Research ==
Based on the work of futurist Theodore J. Gordon in The Millennium Project, Von der Gracht developed the survey software 'Real-time Delphi'. In 2011, he and Gordon presented a joint paper at the World Future Society (WFS) Annual Summit 2011, which summarized lessons learned from 40 real-time Delphi (RTD) studies conducted across their two platforms.

In early 2018, Von der Gracht founded the international journal Futures & Foresight Science, of which he has been an associate editor since 2017, along with professors George Wright from the University of Strathclyde and George Cairns from Queensland University of Technology. Since 2012, he has served on the advisory board of the journal Technological Forecasting & Social Change, and has been an associate editor since 2017.

== Selected publications ==
=== Books and reports ===
- The future of logistics: scenarios for 2025. Dissertation. Gabler 2008, ISBN 9783834910820
- Heiko von der Gracht, Michael Salcher, Nikolaus Graf Kerssenbrock (2015); The Energy Challenge: A Licence for Navigating the Future; REDLINE; ISBN 9783864148897
- Heiko A. von der Gracht, Angelika Huber-Strasser, Marcus Schüller, Nils Müller, Petra Lichtenau, Hannah Zühlke (2018); Rethinking the value chain. A study on AI, humanoids and robots - Artificial Intelligence: Possible business application and development scenarios to 2040 (via ResearchGate)
- Sascha L. Schmidt, Heiko A. von der Gracht, Daniel Beiderbeck, Gerrit Heidemann (2023); AI, Blockchain, and immersive technologies: Metaversal business models of professional football clubs in 2030 (via ResearchGate)

=== Articles ===
- Consensus Measurement in Delphi Studies – Review and Implications for Future Quality Assurance. In: Technological Forecasting & Social Change. Vol. 79, No. 8, 2012, p. 1525–1536, doi:10.1016/j.techfore.2012.04.013.
- with Daniel Beiderbeck, Nicolas Frevel, Sascha L. Schmidt, Vera M. Schweitzer: Preparing, conducting, and analyzing Delphi surveys: Cross-disciplinary practices, new directions, and advancements In: MethodsX. Vol. 8, 2021, p. 101401, doi:10.1016/j.mex.2021.101401.
- with Christoph Markmann, Alexander Spickermann, Alexander Brem: Improving the question formulation in Delphi‐like surveys: Analysis of the effects of abstract language and amount of information on response behavior. In: Futures & Foresight Science. 2020;e56, doi:10.1002/ffo2.56.
- with Inga-Lena Darkow: Scenarios for the Logistics Service Industry: A Delphi-based analysis for 2025. In: International Journal of Production Economics. Vol. 127, No. 1, 2010, p. 46–59, doi:10.1016/j.ijpe.2010.04.013.
- with Tobias Gnatzy, Johannes Warth, Inga-Lena Darkow: Validating an Innovative Real-Time Delphi Approach – A methodological comparison between real-time and conventional Delphi studies. In: Technological Forecasting & Social Change. Vol. 78, No. 9, 2011, p. 1681–1694, doi:10.1016/j.techfore.2011.04.006.
- with Robert Vennemann, Inga-Lena Darkow: Corporate Foresight and Innovation Management: A Portfolio – Approach in Evaluating Organizational Development. In: Futures – The journal of policy, planning and futures studies. Vol. 42, No. 4, 2010, p. 380–393, doi:10.1016/j.futures.2009.11.023.
- with Jay E. Gary: The Future of the Foresight Professionals: Results from a Delphi Study. In: Futures – The journal of policy, planning and futures studies. Vol. 71, 2015, p. 132–145, doi:10.1016/j.futures.2015.03.005.
- with Victor A. Bañuls, Murray Turoff, Andrzej M. J. Skulimowski, and Theodore J. Gordon: Foresight Support Systems: The future role of ICT for foresight. In: Technological Forecasting & Social Change. Vol. 97, 2015, p. 1–6, doi:10.1016/j.techfore.2014.08.010.
