= Hyesug Park =

German ceramist (born 1966)

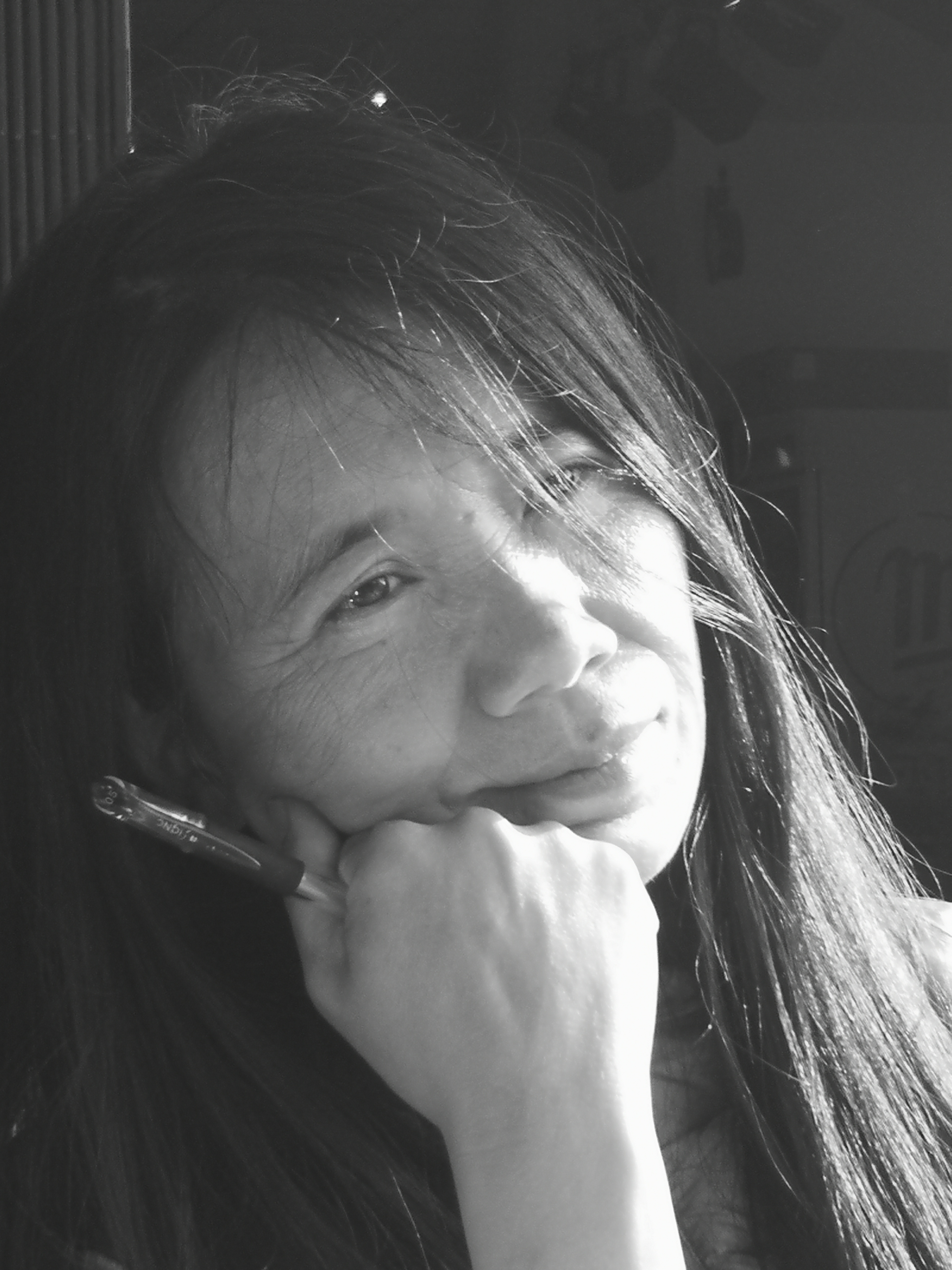
- Hyesug Park in 2025
- Born: 1966 (age 59–60); Jinhae, South Korea
- Education: Hochschule Niederrhein
- Occupations: ceramist; educator
- Years active: 2008–now
- Website: https://www.hyesugpark.com

Hyesug Park (born 1966 in Jinhae, South Korea) is a German ceramist and educator of South Korean origin, recognized for her innovative contributions to contemporary ceramics.

== Biographie ==
=== Early life and education ===
Park was born in 1966 in Jinhae, a district that became part of Changwon City in 2010. She moved to Germany to pursue higher education in the arts. From 2001 to 2007, she studied Ceramic, Porcelain, and Glass Design under Professors Gerhard Hahn and Thomas Klegin at Hochschule Niederrhein in Krefeld. During her studies, in 2006 and 2007, she served as an assistant to Professor Hahn, gaining valuable teaching and research experience.

=== Artistic career ===
In 2008, Park undertook a guest atelier residency at Raketenstation Hombroich in Neuss, an experience that influenced her artistic development. Her work is characterized by a fusion of traditional Korean ceramic techniques with contemporary design, reflecting her bicultural background. Park's creations often explore themes of nature and transformation, utilizing materials such as porcelain and glass to craft sculptures and functional pieces.

== Teaching and Academic Roles ==
Park has been active in academia, sharing her expertise with students in various institutions. From 2008 to 2015 she has held a lectureship at the chair for Individualized Production in Architecture at RWTH Aachen University. And until 2019, she also served in three different chairs in the Faculty of Architecture at the same university.

== Awards and recognitions ==
Throughout her career, Park has received several accolades:

- 2013: Resident Prize from the International Ceramic Magazine Editors Association (ICMEA) in Fuping, China.
- 2009: Awarded in 'Manufactum,' the 24th State Exhibition for the Determination of State Prizes for Crafts in North Rhine-Westphalia.
- 2008: Second Prize in 'Glasplastik und Garten,' an international exhibition in Munster.
- 2005: Recognition in the International Competition of the World Ceramic Biennale in Korea.
- 2004: Awarded in the 'Moerser Kunstpreis' in Moers, Germany.

== Exhibitions ==
Park's work has been showcased in numerous exhibitions:

- 2023: Participated in "ArtArtist" at Raum für Kunst, Düsseldorf; "Swing by" at SITTart Gallery, Düsseldorf; and the "LA Art Show" in Los Angeles, USA.
- 2013: Exhibited in the International Ceramic Magazine Editors Association (ICMEA) Competition in Fuping, China.
- 2011: Featured in "Transform" alongside Evangelos Papadopoulos, Gerd-xo, and Christian Voigt at Atelierhaus Aachen.
- 2009: Showcased in 'Manufactum,' the 24th State Exhibition for the Determination of State Prizes for Crafts in North Rhine-Westphalia at the Niederrheinisches Museum für Volkskunde und Kulturgeschichte e.V., Kevelaer.
- 2008: Participated in 'Glasplastik und Garten,' an international exhibition in Munster.

== Residencies ==
In 2019, Park was an artist-in-residence at the Creative Centre of Stöðvarfjörður in Iceland, where she engaged with the local environment to inspire new works.
