= ELAC =

ELAC can refer to:

- eLAC Action Plans
- East Los Angeles College
- Elac, a German loudspeaker manufacturer
- Elevator and Aileron Computer of the A320
