= Institute for the Future =

American non-profit thinktank

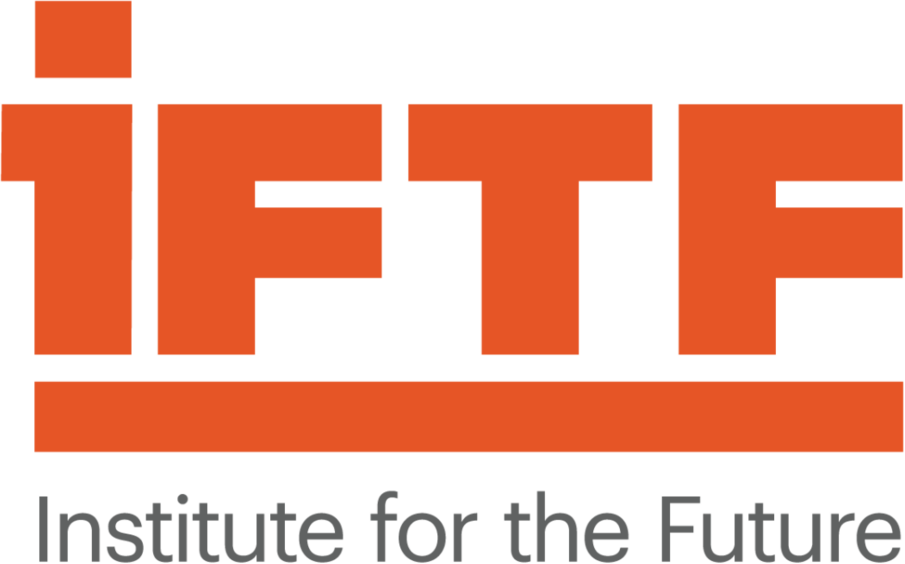
- Type: Not for profit
- Industry: Future Forecasting
- Founded: 1968; 58 years ago in Middletown, Connecticut, United States
- Founders: Frank Davidson, Olaf Helmer, Paul Baran, Arnold Kramish, and Theodore Gordon
- Headquarters: 201 Hamilton Avenue, Palo Alto, United States
- Key people: Marina Gorbis
- Services: Ten Year Forecast, Technology Horizons, Health Horizons
- Website: iftf.org

The Institute for the Future (IFTF) is a Palo Alto, California, US–based not-for-profit think tank. It was established, in 1968, as a spin-off from the RAND Corporation to help organizations plan for the long-term future, a subject known as futures studies.

== History ==
=== Genesis ===
First references to the idea of an Institute for the Future may be found in a 1966 Prospectus by Olaf Helmer and others. While at RAND Corporation, Helmer had already been involved with developing the Delphi method of futures studies. He, and others, wished to extend the work further with an emphasis on examining multiple scenarios. This can be seen in the prospectus summary:

- To explore systematically the possible futures for our [USA] nation and for the international community.
- To ascertain which among these possible futures seems desirable, and why.
- To seek means by which the probability of their occurrence can be enhanced through appropriate purposeful action.

=== First years ===
The Institute opened in 1968, in Middletown, Connecticut. The initial group was led by Frank Davidson and included Olaf Helmer, Paul Baran, Arnold Kramish, and Theodore Gordon.

The Institute's work initially relied on the forecasting methods built upon by Helmer while at RAND. The Delphi method was used to glean information from multiple anonymous sources. It was augmented by Cross Impact Analysis, which encouraged analysts to consider multiple future scenarios.

While precise and powerful, the methods that had been developed in a corporate environment were oriented to providing business and economic analyses. At a 1971 conference on mathematical modelling Helmer noted the need for similar improvements in societal modelling. Early attempts at doing so included a "Future State of the Union" report, formatted according to the traditional US Presidential address to the Nation.

Despite establishing an excellent reputation for painstaking analysis of future analyses and forecasting methods, various problems meant that the Institute struggled to find its footing at first. In 1970 Helmer took over the leadership from Davidson, and the Institute shifted its headquarters to Menlo Park, California.

In 1971 Roy Amara took over from Helmer, who continued to run the Middletown office until his departure in 1973. Amara held this position until 1990. During Amara's presidency, the Institute conducted some of the earliest studies of the impact of the ARPANET on collaborative work and scientific research, and was notable for its research on computer mediated communications, also known as groupware.

Starting from the early seventies astrophysicist and computer scientist Jacques Vallee, sociologist Bob Johansen, and technology forecaster Paul Saffo worked for IFTF.

=== An increase in corporate focus ===
In 1975 the Corporate Associates Program was started to assist private organisations interpret emerging trends and the long-term consequences. Although this program operated until 2001, its role as the Institute's main reporting tool was superseded by the Ten Year Forecast in 1978.

In 1984 the sociologist Herbert L Smith noted that, by the late 1970s, the idea of an open Union reporting format had given way to the proprietary Ten Year Forecast. Smith interpreted this as a renewed focus on business forecasting as public funds became scarce.

It is not clear how pertinent Smith's observations were to how the Institute was operating in this period. Sociologists such as Bob Johansen continued to be active in the Institute's projects. Having taken part in early ARPANET development, Institute staff were well aware of the impact that computer networking would have on society and its inclusion in policy making. However, in a 1984 essay, Roy Amara appeared to acknowledge some form of crisis, and a renewed interest in societal forecasting.

=== Evolution of societal forecasting ===
New ways of presenting studies to a less specialised audience were adopted, or developed. As an aid to memory retention, 'Vignetting' presented future scenarios as short stories; to illustrate the point of the scenario, and engage the reader's attention. Later initiatives showed an increasing emphasis on narrative engagement, e.g. 'Artifacts of the future', and 'Human-future interaction'.

Ethnographic forecasting was adopted as it became recognised that "society" was actually a myriad of sub-cultures, each with its own outlook.

While older forecasting methods sought the advice of field experts, newer techniques sought the statistical input from all members of society. Public interaction, provided via the internet and social media, made it possible to engage in "bottom up forecasting". While roleplaying and simulation games had long been part of a forecaster's tools, they could now be scaled up into "massively multiplayer forecasting games" such as Superstruct. This game enlisted the blogs and wikis of over 5,000 people to discuss life 10 years in the future; presenting them with a set of hypothetical, overlapping social threats, and encouraging them to seek collaborative "superstruct" solutions. The concept of the superstruct was subsequently incorporated into the Institute's 'Foresight Engine' tool.

== Work ==
The Institute maintains research programs on the futures of technology, health, and organizations. It publishes a variety of reports and maps, as well as Future Now, a blog on emerging technologies. It offers three programs to its clients:

- The Ten year forecast is the Institute's signature piece, having operated since 1978. It tracks today's latent signals, and forecasts what they might mean for business in ten years' time.
- The Technology Horizons program, beginning around 2004, is described by the Institute as "combining a deep understanding of technology and societal forces to identify and evaluate discontinuities and innovations in the next three to ten years".
- The Health horizons program has operated since 2005. The Institute describes its purpose as "seeking more resilient responses for the complex challenges facing global health".

In 2014 the Institute moved its headquarters to 201 Hamilton Avenue, Palo Alto, California.

The Institute's annual publication Future Now is intended to provide summaries of the Institute's body of research. The inaugural edition was published in February 2017. Its theme The New Body Language concentrated on the Technology Horizons Program's studies on human and machine symbiosis.

== People ==
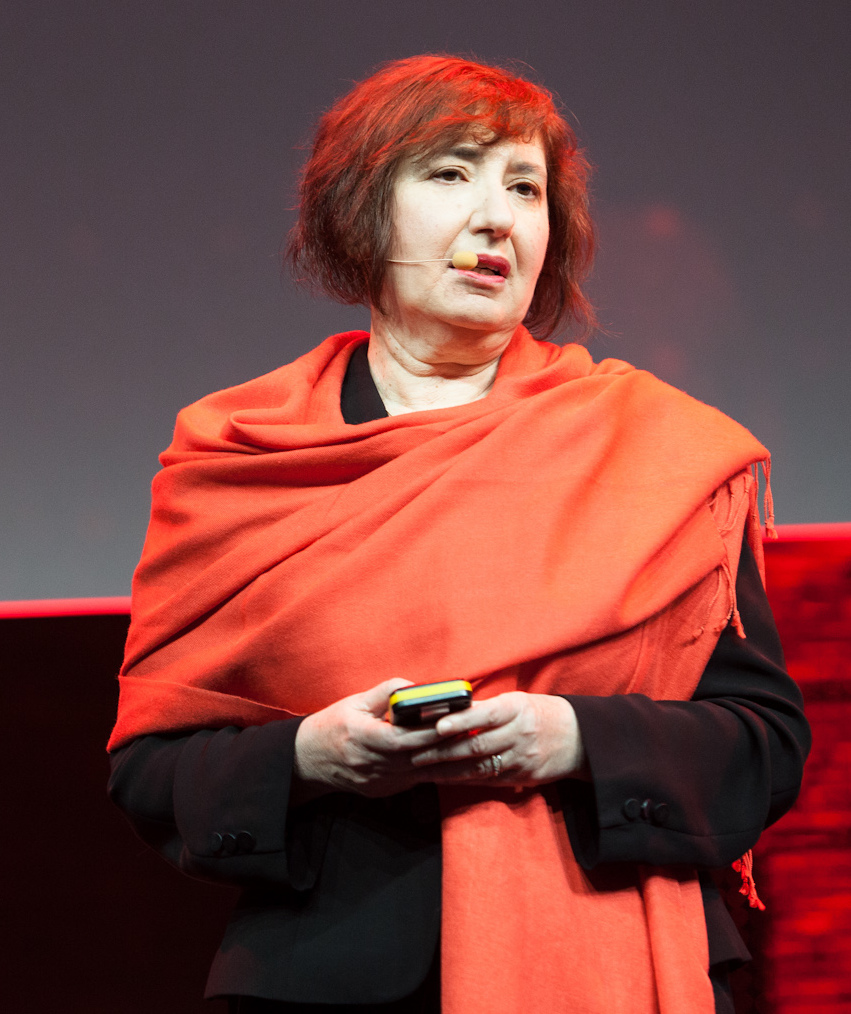
Marina Gorbis, 2013

As of 2016 the Institute's executive director is Marina Gorbis. Also associated with the institute are David Pescovitz, Anthony M. Townsend, Jane McGonigal, and Jamais Cascio.

=== Past leaders ===
- Frank Davidson (1968–70)
- Olaf Helmer (1970)
- Roy Amara (1971–90)
- Ian Morrison (1990–96)
- Bob Johansen (1996–2004)
- Peter Banks (2004–06)
- Marina Gorbis (2006–)

== Ratings ==
Guidestar, the largest information source on nonprofit organizations and private foundations in the United States, gave Institute for the Future a Gold Transparency seal for 2023. Charity Navigator, the world's largest evaluator of nonprofits, gave it a score of 87% earning it a rating of three out of four stars, stating, "If this organization aligns with your passions and values, you can give with confidence."
