= Notation system =

Convention where symbols represent concepts

In linguistics and semiotics, a notation system is a system of graphics or symbols, characters and abbreviated expressions, used (for example) in artistic and scientific disciplines to represent technical facts and quantities by convention. Therefore, a notation is a collection of related symbols that are each given an arbitrary meaning, created to facilitate structured communication within a domain knowledge or field of study.

Standard notations refer to general agreements in the way things are written or denoted. The term is generally used in technical and scientific areas of study like mathematics, physics, chemistry and biology, but can also be seen in areas like business, economics and music.

== Written communication ==
=== Writing systems ===
- Phonographic writing systems, by definition, use symbols to represent components of auditory language, i.e. speech, which in turn refers to things or ideas. The two main kinds of phonographic notational system are the alphabet and the syllabary. Some written languages are more consistent in their correlation of written symbols (or graphemes) with sound (or phonemes), and are therefore considered to have better phonemic orthography.
- Ideographic writing, by definition, refers to things or ideas independently of their pronunciation in any language. Some ideographic systems are also pictograms that convey meaning through their pictorial resemblance to a physical object.

=== Linguistics ===
- Various brackets, parentheses, slashes, and lines are used around words and letters in linguistics to distinguish written from spoken forms, etc. See International Phonetic Alphabet § Brackets and transcription delimiters.

=== Biology and medicine ===
- Nucleic acid notation
- Systems Biology Graphical Notation (SBGN)
- Sequence motif pattern-description notations
- Cytogenetic notation
- Energy Systems Language

=== Chemistry ===
- A chemical formula describes a chemical compound using element symbols and subscripts, e.g. H_{2}O for water or C_{6}H_{12}O_{6} for glucose
- SMILES is a notation for describing the structure of a molecule with a plain text string, e.g. N=N for nitrogen or CCO for ethanol

=== Computing ===
- BNF (Backus normal form, or Backus–Naur form) and EBNF (extended Backus-Naur form) are the two main notation techniques for context-free grammars.
- Drakon-charts are a graphical notation of algorithms and procedural knowledge.
- Hungarian notation is an identifier naming convention in computer programming, that represents the type or intended use of a variable with a specific pattern within its name.
- Mathematical markup languages are computer notations for representing mathematical formulae.
- Various notations have been developed to specify regular expressions.
- The APL programming language provided a rich set of very concise new notations

=== Logic ===
A variety of symbols are used to express logical ideas; see the List of logic symbols

=== Management ===
- Time and motion study symbols such as therbligs

=== Mathematics ===
Mathematical notation is used to represent various kinds of mathematical ideas.

- All types of notation in probability
- Cartesian coordinate system, for representing position and other spatial concepts in analytic geometry
- Notation for differentiation, common representations of the derivative in calculus
- Big O notation, used for example in analysis to represent less significant elements of an expression, to indicate that they will be neglected
- Z notation, a formal notation for specifying objects using Zermelo–Fraenkel set theory and first-order predicate logic
- Ordinal notation
- Set-builder notation, a formal notation for defining sets in set theory
- Systems to represent very large numbers
  - Conway chained arrow notation, an arrow system
  - Knuth's up-arrow notation, an arrow system
  - Steinhaus–Moser notation, Polygon Numbers
  - Symbol Levelled notation, The Ultimate Leveller
- Numeral systems, notation for writing numbers, including
  - Arabic numerals
  - Roman numerals
  - Scientific notation for expressing large and small numbers
  - Engineering notation
  - Sign-value notation, using signs or symbols to represent numbers
  - Positional notation also known as place-value notation, in which each position is related to the next by a multiplier which is called the base of that numeral system
    - Binary notation, a positional notation in base two
    - Octal notation, a positional notation in base eight, used in some computers
    - Decimal notation, a positional notation in base ten
    - Hexadecimal notation, a positional notation in base sixteen, commonly used in computers
    - Sexagesimal notation, an ancient numeral system in base sixty
- In geometry:
  - Christoffel symbols
  - Polyhedral symbol
  - Schläfli symbol
  - Geometric dimensioning and tolerancing
  - Well-known text representation of geometry
- See also Table of mathematical symbols - for general tokens and their definitions.

=== Physics ===
- Bra–ket notation, or Dirac notation, is an alternative representation of probability distributions in quantum mechanics.
- Tensor index notation is used when formulating physics (particularly continuum mechanics, electromagnetism, relativistic quantum mechanics and field theory, and general relativity) in the language of tensors.

=== Typographical conventions ===
- Infix notation, the common arithmetic and logical formula notation, such as "a + b − c".
- Polish notation or "prefix notation", which places the operator before the operands (arguments), such as "+ a b".
- Reverse Polish notation or "postfix notation", which places the operator after the operands, such as "a b +".

=== Sports and games ===
- Baseball scorekeeping, to represent a game of baseball
- Aresti Catalogue, to represent aerobatic manoeuvres
- Chess notation, to represent moves in a game of chess
  - Algebraic notation
    - Portable Game Notation
  - Descriptive notation
  - Forsyth–Edwards Notation
- Siteswap notation represents a juggling pattern as a sequence of numbers
- Singmaster notation, to represent Rubik's Cube moves

== Graphical notations ==
=== Music ===
- Musical notation permits a composer to express musical ideas in a musical composition, which can be read and interpreted during performance by a trained musician; there are many different ways to do this (hundreds have been proposed), although staff notation provides by far the most widely used system of modern musical symbols.

=== Dance and movement ===
- Benesh Movement Notation permits a graphical representation of human bodily movements
- Laban Movement Analysis or Labanotation permits a graphical representation of human bodily movements
- Eshkol-Wachman Movement Notation permits a graphical representation of bodily movements of other species in addition to humans, and indeed any kind of movement (e.g. aircraft aerobatics)
- Juggling diagrams represent juggling patterns
- Aresti aerobatic symbols provides a way to represent flight maneuvers in aerobatics

=== Science ===
- Feynman diagrams permit a graphical representation of a perturbative contribution to the transition amplitude or correlation function of a quantum mechanical or statistical field theory
- Structural formulas are graphical representations of molecules
- Venn diagrams shows logical relations between a finite collection of sets.
- Drakon-charts are a graphical representation of algorithms and procedural knowledge.
- Unified Modeling Language is a standard notation for many types of diagrams

=== Other systems ===
- Whyte notation for classifying steam locomotives by wheel arrangement

== See also ==
- Abuse of notation
- Cognitive dimensions of notations
- Formal notation
- Secondary notation
