= Cross impact analysis =

Methodology in futures studies

Cross-impact analysis is a methodology developed by Theodore J. Gordon and Olaf Helmer in 1966 to help determine how relationships between events would impact resulting events and reduce uncertainty in the future. The Central Intelligence Agency (CIA) became interested in the methodology in the late 1960s and early 1970s as an analytic technique for predicting how different factors and variables would impact future decisions. In the mid-1970s, futurists began to use the methodology in larger numbers as a means to predict the probability of specific events and determine how related events impacted one another. By 2006, cross-impact analysis matured into a number of related methodologies with uses for businesses and communities as well as futurists and intelligence analysts.

== Development ==
The basic principles of cross-impact analysis date back to the late 1960s, but the original processes were relatively simple and were based on a game design. Eventually, advanced techniques, methodologies, and programs were developed to apply the principles of cross-impact analysis, and the basic method is now applied in futures think tanks, business settings, and the intelligence community. Theodore J. Gordon writes that cross-impact analysis was the result of a question: "can forecasting be based on perceptions about how future events may interact?"

The first format of the method was a card game titled Future, where events were determined by probabilities, a special die, and impacts from previously played events. This initial game format of cross-impact analysis was programmed for computers at UCLA in 1968. From this point on, the methodology underwent increasing development and sophistication to meet certain needs and conditions of users.

As cross-impact analysis expanded in the early 1970s, researchers and futurists modified the basic principles to improve on the methodology. In 1972, researchers at the Institute for the Future added time-series instead of "Slice of Time", Norman Dalkey used conditional probabilities, and Julius Kane developed "KSIM", a simulation technique that used interactions between time series variables rather than events. In 1974, Duperrin and Godet developed Cross Impact Systems and Matrices (or SMIC) in France for prospective forecasting studies.

Advancements in simulation models continued into the 1980s. In 1980, Selwyn Enzer at the University of California incorporated cross-impact analysis into a simulation method known as Interax, The Delphi technique was combined with Cross Impact Analysis in 1984, and researchers at Texas A&M University used Cross Impact in a process called "EZ-IMPACT" that was based on Kane's algorithm from KSIM.

After simulation models and methods were developed for cross-impact analysis, analysts began to develop the range of topics that it could address. Cross-impact analysis was being used to solve real world issues as John Stover applied the methodology to simulate the economy of Uruguay. However, real world application of the methodology advanced rapidly in the 1990s. By 1993, SMIC was used for subjects as diverse as the nuclear industry, world geopolitical evolution, and corporate activities and jobs to 2000. In 1999, Robert Blanning and Bruce Reinig from the Owen Graduate School of Management at Vanderbilt University utilized a modified form of cross-impact analysis to determine futures for Hong Kong and the Hong Kong economy as the United Kingdom relinquished control to the People's Republic of China.

== Methodology ==
Cross-impact analysis has two schools of thought and ways of approach. The first is the futures forecasting style that originally developed the methodology. The second is a sub-school of intelligence analysts which modified the original methodology to better address their needs. Nevertheless, cross-impact analysis is based upon the premise that events and activities do not happen in a vacuum and other events and the surrounding environment can significantly influence the probability of certain events to occur.

Cross-impact analysis attempts to connect relationships between events and variables. These relationships are then categorized as positive or negative relative to each other, and are used to determine which events or scenarios are most probable or likely to occur within a given time frame.

=== Futures forecasting style ===
The futures forecasting style is based in the systems and methods developed during the 1970s and 1980s and follows several strict steps.

First, analysts must consider the number and type of events to be considered in the analysis and create an event set. Because each event will have an interaction with every other event, Gordon recommends that 10–40 events be used.

Second, analysts must take the initial probability of each event into account. The probabilities of events must be taken in isolation from one another.

Third, analysts need to generate conditional probabilities that events have on each other. Basically, this asks the question, "If event 'A' occurs, what is the new probability of event 'B' occurring?" This must be done for every possible interaction between events.

Fourth, analysts must test their initial conditional probabilities to ensure that there are no mathematical errors. This is usually done by running simulations in a computer several times.

Fifth, analysts can run the analysis to determine future scenarios, or determine how significant other events are to specific events.

==== Mathematical technique ====
The futurist forecasting style of cross-impact analysis relies heavily on probabilities and mathematics in its processes. Initial probabilities and conditional probabilities are calculated using either percentages or factor numbers equivalent to percentages. Researchers must calculate the numerical values or percentages very precisely to ensure accurate results and that impacts of events on each other are realistic and not contradictory. In addition, researchers must be careful when calculating negative impacts as the negative influence can create mathematical impossibilities.

This mathematical strictness makes the futurist forecasting style of cross-impact analysis uniform and differences in actual analytic methods, simulations and programs have only minor differences to fit the needs of the specific researcher or analyst.

==== Relationship to Delphi technique ====
The accuracy of the math and specific events requires special expertise in the events or topic of discussion. In order to get the insight needed to get events and calculations, analysts typically contact a large number of experts and ask their opinions on events or probabilities in person as groups or through surveys.

These groupings often resemble the Delphi Technique, which is an analytic technique that gathers a group of experts on a subject together and asks their opinion on a scenario or prediction. Usually, analysts consider the average prediction or scenario as the most likely to occur. The two are so closely related, that analysts often use the two techniques in combination or as part of a larger methodology.

==== Strengths ====
The futurist forecasting style of cross-impact analysis carries a few key strengths. Its use of groups of experts ensures a number of opinions worth considering when calculating probabilities of events. The level of mathematics in calculating probabilities ensures that the results are as accurate as a researcher can make them. In addition, when used on consort with other analytic techniques, this type of cross-impact analysis can give greater quantitative results to an otherwise qualitative analysis. The relative conformity of methods ensures that analysts using different methods or simulations can come to similar results, making the results testable in a broader setting.

==== Weaknesses ====
Many of the strengths of the futurist forecasting style of cross-impact analysis give rise to many of its weaknesses. The conformity of the style generates a certain level of inflexibility when dealing with variables other than events, like environmental conditions or political issues. In addition, the severe level of mathematics involved in this style leads to long delays as scenarios must be run to ensure mathematical accuracy of probabilities, or particular issues with Bayes' theorem appear. The level of math also require researchers to either be knowledgeable in math or additional computer programs to deal with the scenarios and probabilities of the method.

=== Intelligence analysis style ===
Shortly after Theodore Gordon and Olaf Helmer developed the original cross-impact method, the United States intelligence community picked up the technique and has been using it for over thirty years.

While the basic premise of relationships and impacts between multiple variables remains the same, the intelligence community modified cross-impact analysis to meet its various needs.

The intelligence community has created a more flexible and variable system than the original methodology. Event relationships and impacts are still similar to the method incorporated by futurists. However, intelligence analysts have expanded the parameters of cross-impact analysis beyond comparing events to include variables like environment, political circumstances, and popular opinion to influence probabilities of certain events. In addition, intelligence analysts can choose to use more flexible measurements like "enhancing", "inhibiting", or "unrelated" instead of the rigid mathematics of the tradition methodology to include non-event variables.

==== Cross-impact matrix ====
A major part of the intelligence analysis style of cross-impact analysis is the cross-impact matrix. The matrix is a visualization of the cross-impact analysis and allows for modification. It also allows an analyst to find both the most influential variables and those variables that are impacted by the most other variables, not just direct, one-to-one relationships. While several traditional cross-impact analysis methods suggest the creation of a matrix, the priority still relies in probabilities, one-to-one relationships, and the order of events.

In the intelligence analysis style cross-impact matrix, analysts use pluses and minuses instead of numerical values allowing for non-event variables and allowing the analyst to compare variables directly to all other variables without calculations.

==== Strengths ====
Intelligence analysis style cross-impact analysis has several key advantages. The flexibility of the model allows for analysts to measure different types of variables against each other, not just probable events. In addition, the ability to discard stringent mathematical criteria means that researchers do not need extensive mathematics training or specialized software to use cross-impact analysis. This also enables experts in a topic to use the methodology relatively quickly without having to cross-check the numerous calculations faced by the Futurist Forecasting Style.

==== Weaknesses ====
The lack of stringent procedures of the intelligence analysis style also bring considerable drawbacks. The flexibility of the style relies heavily on the opinions and knowledge of the analysts involved, and is difficult to reproduce results with a different group. In addition, the option to remove mathematics can harm analysts by creating results that do not have numerical values to back them. This lack of mathematics may make the process easier at first, but the amount of specialized software is limited when compared to the Futurist Forecasting Style, making work more tedious as the number of variables increases.

== Applications ==
Researchers can use cross-impact analysis for a wide variety of applications. Futurists have already used the methodology for forecasting events in specific industries, politics, markets, and even entire communities.

In intelligence analysis, analysts can use the method to predict events, conditions, or decisions based on a wide variety of variables and conditions at local, national, and international levels.

== See also ==
- Futures techniques
- Probability
- Analysis of competing hypotheses
