= Sadi Evren Seker =

Turkish computer scientist

- Şadi Evren Şeker
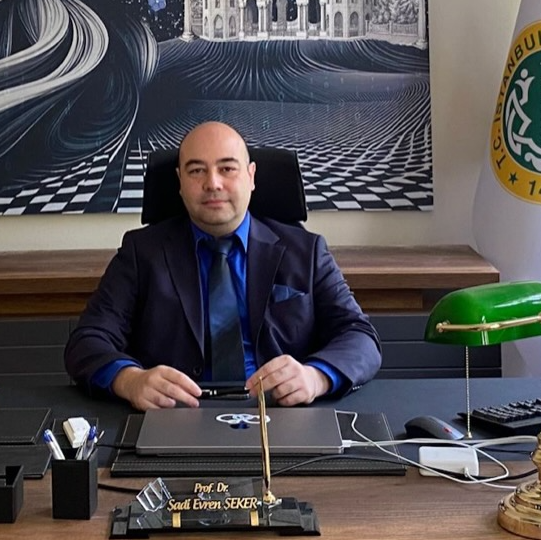
- Seker in 2023
- Born: 1979 (age 46–47); Istanbul, Turkey
- Citizenship: Turkey
- Education: Yeditepe University; Istanbul Technical University; Yildiz Technical University
- Scientific career
- Fields: Data science; Big data; Artificial Intelligence; Computer Science; Management Information Systems
- Workplaces: Istanbul University
- Website: https://www.sadievrenseker.com

Sadi Evren Seker is a Turkish computer scientist and data scientist. He is the first person to introduce the concept of "Computerized Argument Delphi Technique" in the literature, which is an enhancement to the Delphi method originally developed on Project RAND.

== Career and research ==
After obtaining a Ph.D. degree in computer engineering from Yildiz Technical University in 2010, Seker joined the faculty at Istanbul University in 2011 as an assistant professor. He also served as a visiting scholar at the Data Mining Lab at the University of Texas at Dallas from 2012 to 2014. In addition, he held a visiting professorship at Smith College in Massachusetts, within the Department of Computer Science from 2016 to 2017 In recognition of his achievements, he was promoted to the rank of professor in the Department of Computer Engineering in 2020.

He is the inventor of several data science methods and holds patents for:

- A method and system for clustering performance evaluation and increment
- Computer-implemented methods for selection of features in predictive data modeling
- A machine learning based prediction system and method

He currently serves as the Dean of the Computer and Information Technologies Faculty at Istanbul University. His researches involves the implementation of data science algorithms in various industries, including banking, geology, natural language processing and big data analytics He has published more than 200 scientific journals and books and he is among the top 5k scientist in Turkey. His work has been covered by local news agencies on several occasions.

Seker's research focuses on Responsible AI, Automated machine learning and explainable artificial intelligence.

== Publications ==
- Seker, wrote the book Business Intelligence and Data Mining with Weka (Turkish: İş Zekası ve Veri Madenciliği, weka ile) (Cinius, 2013).
- Seker, is the Turkish editor of the book Algorithms, originally written by Robert Sedgewick and Kevin Wayne
- GISQAF: MapReduce guided spatial query processing and analytics system, funded by the National Science Foundation under Award No. CNS 1229652 and the Air Force Office of Scientific Research under Award No. FA-9550-09-1-0468
- Recurring and Novel Class Detection Using Class-Based Ensemble for Evolving Data Stream, in TKDE which is based on work supported by the AFOSR under awards FA9450-08-1-0260 and FA9950-10-1-0088 and by NASA under award 2008-00867-01.
- Computerized Argument Delphi Technique (2015) from IEEE Xplore
- His full profile of publications and background can be access from University Academic Profile
- His author profile with his publications on IEEE is available on IEEE Xplore and his DBLP profile is available for online access.
- There are some news about his works on democratization of artificial intelligence for SMEs
