= Warp knitting =

Manufacturing process

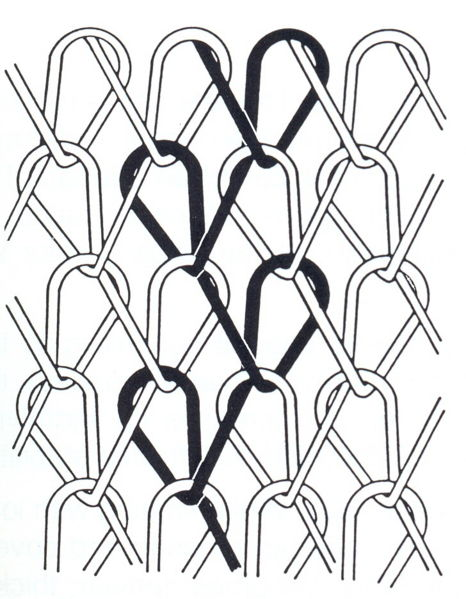
Basic pattern of warp knitting. Parallel yarns zigzag lengthwise along the fabric, each loop securing a loop of an adjacent strand from the previous row.

Warp knitting is defined as a loop-forming process in which the yarn is fed into the knitting zone, parallel to the fabric selvage. It forms vertical loops in one course and then moves diagonally to knit the next course. Thus the yarns zigzag from side to side along the length of the fabric. Each stitch in a course is made by many different yarns. Each stitch in one wale is made by several different yarns.

== History ==
Credit for the invention is usually given to a mechanic called Josiah Crane in 1775. He likely sold his invention to Richard March who patented (No. 1186) a warp frame in 1778. In the intervening three years March likely had discussed the device with Morris who submitted a similar patent (No.1282) for a twisting machine for making Brussels point lace. These early machines were modifications of the stocking frame with an additional warp beam.

In 1795, the machine was successfully used to make lacy fabrics. Warp frames could be used with any thread, and the warps provided a fixed anchor for the transverse threads. In 1786, Flint invented the point bar which kept the threads at a fixed distance. In 1796, Dawson introduced cams to move the bars, and regulate the twist. Brown and Copstake succeeded in imitating Mechlen net. Lindley invented the bobbin in 1799, and Irving and Skelton the regulator spring. In 1802, Robert Brown of New Radford patented the first twist-frame, a knitter that could produce wide net.

Whittaker's frame of 1804 had half its thread mounted on a warp beam and half wound on bobbins mounted on a carriage.

Heathcote's 1808 improvement of Whittaker's frame was essentially a warp knitting frame. The bobbin carrying beam was reduced to the same size as the machine- he called it a bobbinet. Heathcote's second patent, in 1809, was for a bobbinet that could produce wide fabrics; this was the Old Loughborough.

== Machine classification ==
In general, warp knitting machine is to distinguish between tricot and raschel by the type of sinkers with which the machine is equipped and the role they play in loop formation. The sinkers used for tricot knitting machines control the fabric throughout the knitting cycle. The fabric is held in the throats of the sinkers while the needles rise to clear and the new loops are knocked over in-between them. In Raschel knitting, however, the fabric is controlled by a high take-up tension and the sinkers are only used to ensure that the fabric stays down when the needles rise.

=== Tricot machine ===
Tricot is very common in lingerie and underwear. The right side of the fabric has fine lengthwise ribs while the reverse has crosswise ribs. The properties of these fabrics include having a soft and 'drapey' texture with some lengthwise stretch and almost no crosswise stretch. Tricot machines are produced with 2, 3, or 4 guide bars.

Tricot machines have a vast application, such as elastic and non-elastic mesh fabric, velvet fabric, and others.

Tricot machine generally uses E28, E32, E36, and E40. At present, the widest working width of tricot machine has reached 335 inches.

==== Towel tricot machine ====
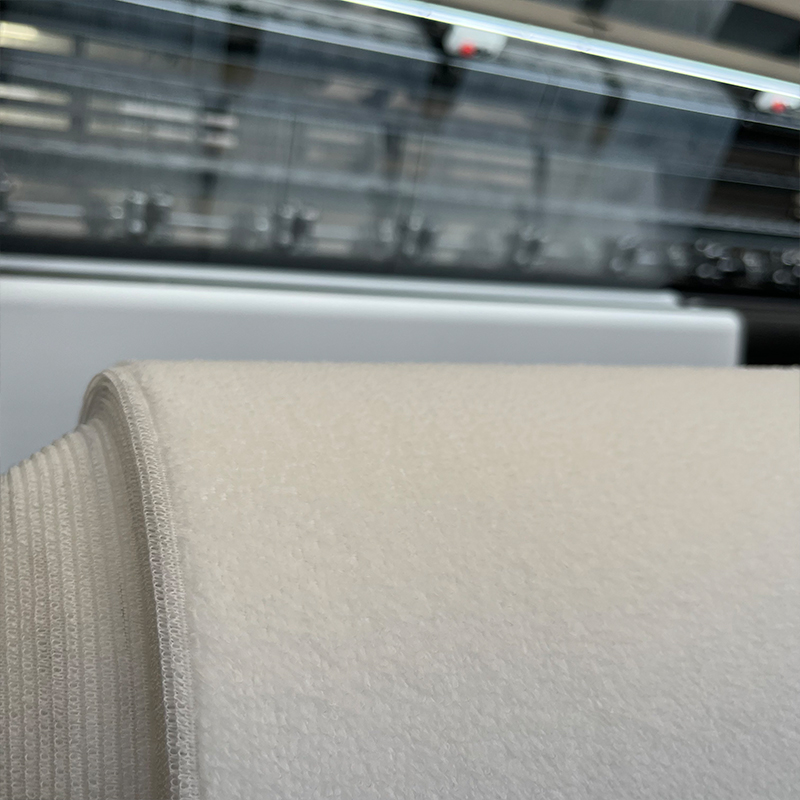
Towel warp knitting machine TS4C for microfiber towel fabrics.

The Terry Warp Knitting Machine holds significant prominence in the production of microfiber terry towels, specifically intended for cleaning purposes. Additionally, the Changzhou A-ZEN terry towel machines, namely the TS4C and TS4C-EL models, demonstrate versatile applicability by accommodating the manufacturing of cotton towels as well. Evidently, the demand for cotton towel knitting machines has been steadily escalating, prompting increased interest from customers.

In contrast to conventional loom terry machines, the microfiber terry towel machine exhibits significantly augmented productivity, while concurrently boasting a more environmentally sustainable and resource-efficient manufacturing process

In addition, the Superpol Towel Machine also belongs to tricot machines.

=== Milanese knit ===
Milanese is stronger, more stable, smoother and more expensive than tricot and, hence, is used in better lingerie. These knit fabrics are made from two sets of yarn knitted diagonally, which results in the face fabric having a fine vertical rib and the reverse having a diagonal structure, and results in these fabrics being lightweight, smooth, and run-resistant. Milanese is now virtually obsolete.

=== Raschel machine ===
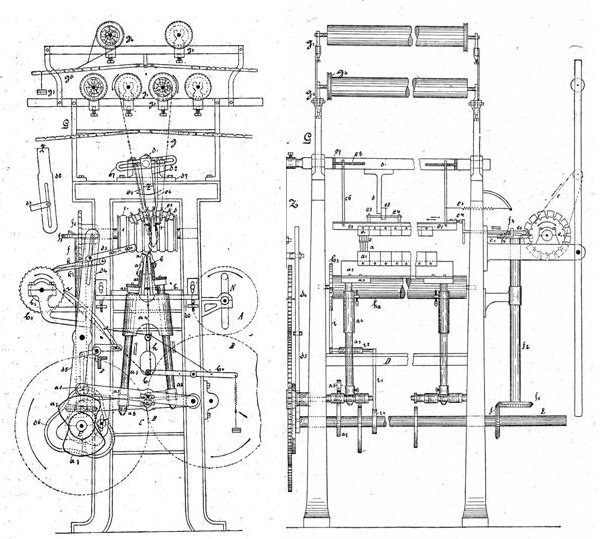
Drawing of an old Raschel machine

In 1855, Redgate combined the principles of a circular loom with those of warp knit. A German firm used this machine to produce "Raschel" shawls, named after the French actress Élisabeth Félice Rachel. In 1859 Wilhelm Barfuss improved the machine to create the Raschel machines. The Jacquard apparatus was adapted to it in the 1870s. The Raschel machine could work at higher speeds than the Leavers machine and proved the most adaptable to the new synthetic fibres, such as nylon and polyester, in the 1950s. Most contemporary machine-made lace is made on Raschel machines.

Raschel knits do not stretch significantly and are often bulky; consequently, they are often used as an unlined material for coats, jackets, straight skirts and dresses. These fabrics can be made out of conventional or novelty yarns which allows for interesting textures and designs to be created. The qualities of these fabrics range from "dense and compact to open and lofty [and] can be either stable or stretchy, and single-faced or reversible. The largest outlet for the Raschel warp knitting machine is for lace fabric and trimmings. Raschel knitting is also used in outdoors and military fabrics for products such as backpacks. It is used to provide a ventilated mesh next to the user's body (covering padding) or mesh pockets and pouches to facilitate visibility of the contents (MIL-C-8061).

Raschel machines include raschel lace machines, double-needle bar raschel machines, raschel jacquard machines, and high-speed raschel machines.

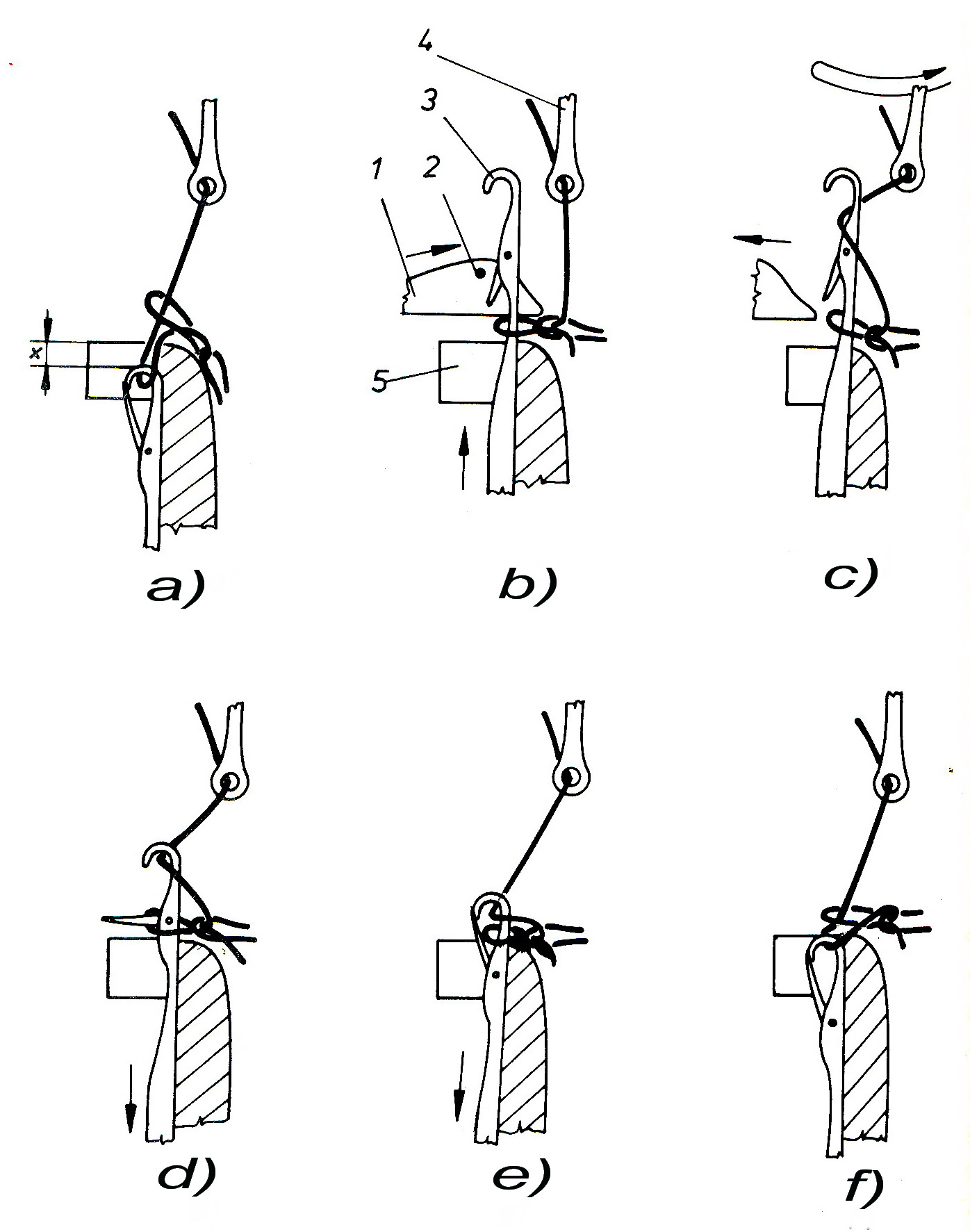
Stages in creating the loop

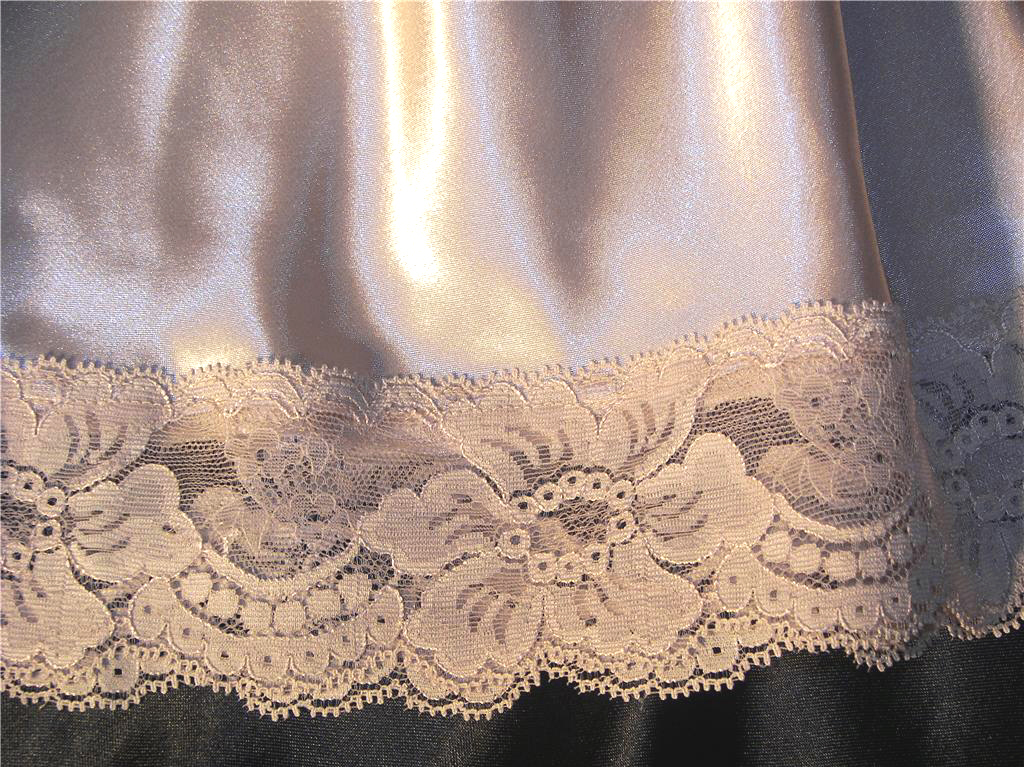
Golden lace

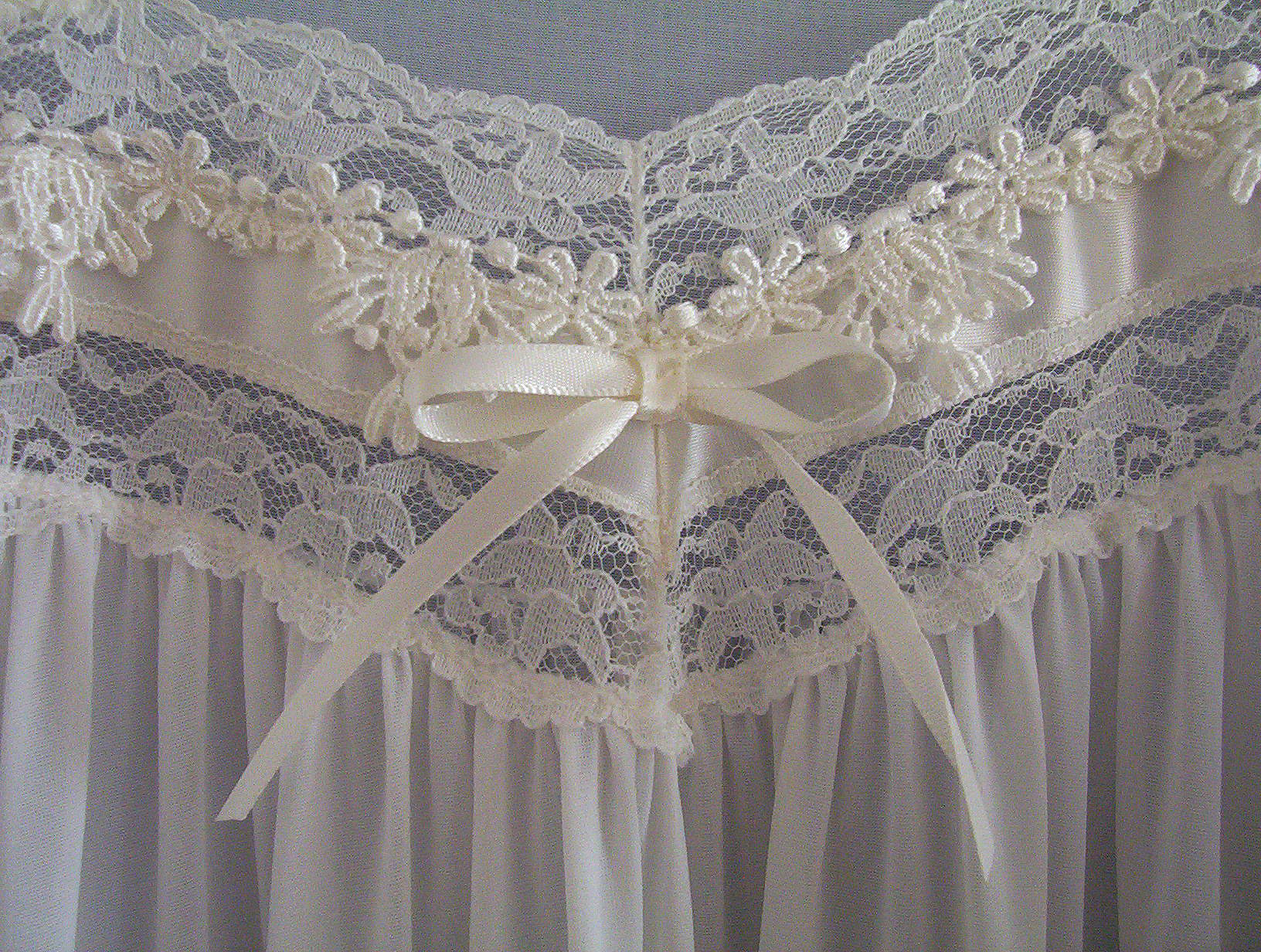
Lace appliqué

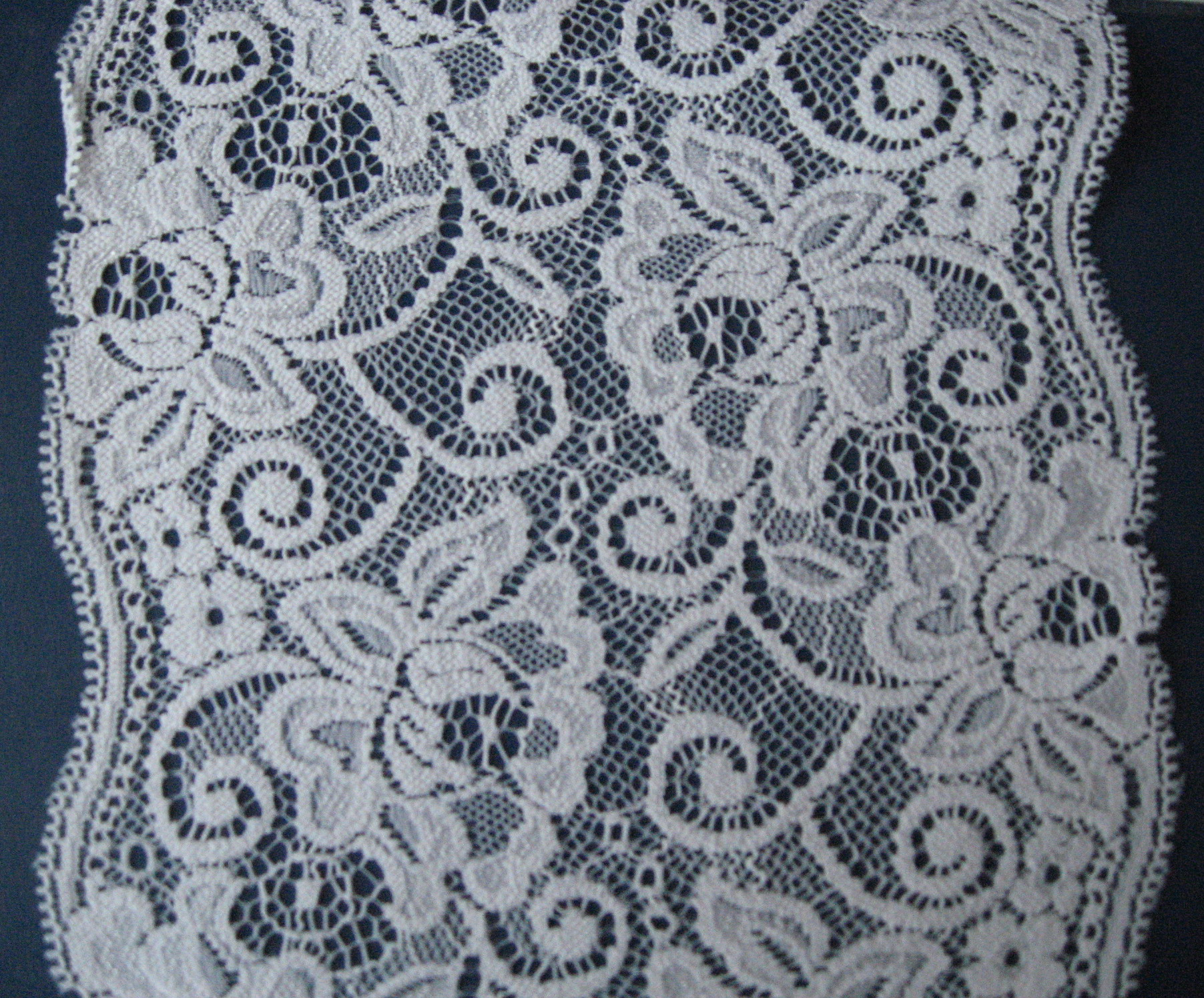
Raschel lace

=== Stitch-bonding ===
Stitch-bonding is a special form of warp knitting and is commonly used for the production of composite materials and technical textiles.

Stitch-bonding machines are used for the sewing processing of nonwoven fabric, to increase its fastness and toughness. The stitch-bonding warp knitting machine or nonwoven warp knitting machine is for producing technical textiles such as shoe interlining, shopping bag, geotextile dewatering bags, reinforced composite glass fiber textile and other fabrics.

As a method of production, stitch-bonding is efficient, and is one of the most modern ways to create reinforced textiles and composite materials for industrial use. The advantages of the stitch-bonding process include its high productivity rate and the scope it offers for functional design of textiles, such as fiber-reinforced plastics. Stitch-bonding involves layers of threads and fabric being joined together with a knitting thread, which creates a layered structure called a multi-ply.

This is created through a warp-knitting thread system, which is fixed on the reverse side of the fabric with a sinker loop, and a weft thread layer. A needle with the warp thread passes through the material, which requires the warp and knitting threads to be moving both parallel and perpendicular to the vertical/warp direction of the stitch-bonding machine. Stitch-bonded fabrics are currently being used in such fields as wind energy generation and aviation. Research is currently being conducted into the usage and benefits of stitch-bonded fabrics as a way to reinforce concrete. Fabrics produced with this process offer the potential of using "sensitive fiber materials such as glass and carbon with only little damage, non-crimp fiber orientation and variable distance between threads".

In the extended stitch-bonding process (or the extended warp-knitting process), the compound needle that pierces the piles is shifted laterally according to the yarn guides. This then makes it possible for the layers of the stitch-bonded fabric to be arranged freely and be made symmetrical in one working step. This process is advantageous to the characteristics of the composite as the "residual stresses resulting from asymmetric alignment of the layers are avoided, [while] the tensile strength and the impact strength of the composite are improved."

=== Needle shift ===
Needle shift technique is when both outer warp layers are secured in one procedure by incorporating a shift of the needle bar during stitching, creating endless possibilities for the arrangement and patterns in stitch-bonding.

== Patterning ==
The pattern creation of warp knitted structures is a complex process, because the structure depends on the motions of several guide bars and where these have yarns. Kyosev demonstrated that for the building of only one loop at one cycle there are 18 geometric configurations of the yarn ends – 3 different directions from which the guide is coming, multiplied by 2 loop types - open or closed, multiplied by 3 different directions in which the yarn/guide is after that going - left, up, or right). For two guide bars the configurations are $18 \cdot 18 = 324$ combinations and the modern machines have 4 and more guide bars. Kyosev and Renkens created various versions of CAD software for 3D design of warp knitted fabrics and contributed with it in a book with the fundamentals of the patterning, where about 100 samples can be downloaded and viewed as 3D structure.

== Advantages ==
Producing textiles through the warp knitting process has the following advantages:

- higher productivity rates than weaving
- variety of fabric constructions
- large working widths
- low stress rate on the yarn that allows for use of fibers such as glass, aramid and carbon
- the creation of three-dimensional structures that can be knitted on double needle bar raschels

== Applications ==
Warp knitted fabrics have several industrial uses, including producing mosquito netting, tulle fabrics, sports wear, shoe fabric, fabrics for printing and advertising, coating substrates and laminating backgrounds.

Research is also being conducted into the use of warp knitted fabrics for industrial applications (for example, to reinforce concrete), and for the production of biotextiles.

== Warp knitting and biotextiles ==
The warp knitting process is also being used to create biotextiles. For example, a warp knitted polyester cardiac support device has been created to attempt to limit the growth of diseased hearts by being installed tightly around the diseased heart. Current research on animals "have confirmed that … the implantation of the device reverses the disease state, which makes this an alternative innovative therapy for patients who have side effects from traditional drug remedies".
