= Yordan Kyosev =

German mathematician & textile engineer (born 1973)

Yordan Kyosev (February 26, 1973) is a German scientist and professor of Bulgarian origin, working in the area of textile and clothing technologies and machines. His book Braiding Technology for Textiles (2014) is an important source for learning industrial braiding, and in 2017 received a book prize from Hochschule Niederrhein (Niederrhein University), Mönchengladbach, Germany. Kyosev has developed software packages for 3D modeling braided structures, braiding machines and warp knitted structures. The algorithms for the software are documented in Kyosev's book Topology-Based Modeling of Textile Structures and Their Joint Assemblies (2019)

== Professional career ==
Kyosev completed a five-year engineering course in Textile Technology at the Technical University of Sofia, Bulgaria. He obtained an M.Sc. in Applied Mathematics and Informatics and a PhD in the area of textile machines in 2002, also at Technical University of Sofia. Between 2006 and 2019 Kyosev was Professor for Textile Materials, Textile Technology and Quality Management at Hochschule Niederrhein - University of Applied Sciences, Mönchengladbach, Germany, with a specialty in braiding and narrow weaving. He is the founder and organizer of the International Week of Narrow and Smart Textiles (2014, 2016, 2020 - postponed because of COVID-19), an important interaction between experts, industries and researchers in this area. In 2019, Kyosev moved to Technical University Dresden where he is chair of Development and Assembly of Textile Products.

== Works ==
=== Applied Mathematics ===
Kyosev developed algorithms for solving fuzzy linear systems of equations, providing first implementing of the theory of Ketty Peeva. In the book, the algorithms are applied for max-min operations, applied as an inference engine for diagnostics of technical, medical and other systems. Later they extend the algorithms for max-product operations, which tends to provide more closer relations of the variables to the natural processes.

=== Textiles ===
In 2006–2008, Kyosev developed a module for 3D visualization of warp-knitted fabrics, integrated into the industrial software Warp3D, for the company ALC Computertechnik, Aachen. The complexity of the warp knitted structures and the challenges of their modeling are summarized in his 2019 book Topology-Based Modeling of Textile Structures and Their Joint Assemblies, while the construction of the warp knitted fabrics is described in the 2019 book Warp Knitted Fabrics Construction.

=== 4D Body scanning ===
Since 2021, Kyosev's group has been studying the application of 4D (high speed) 3D body scanning systems for development of functional clothing. He organized the international conference "Clothing-Body-Interaction" in 2021 which received favorable community feedback. The conference was held again in 2023.

=== (Co-) Authored books ===
- Peeva, K., Kyosev, Y., Fuzzy Relational Calculus: Theory, Applications and Software (with CD-ROM), World Scientific, 2004
- Kyosev, Y., Braiding technology for Textiles, Woodhead Publishing (2014)
- Kyosev, Y., Warp knitting fabrics construction, Springer, 2019
- Kyosev, Y., Topoogy based modelling of textile structures and their assemblies, Springer, 2019

=== (Co-) Edited Books ===
- Kyosev, Y, (Editor) Advances in the braiding technology (Editor) (2016)
- Kyosev, Y. (Editor) Recent advances in the narrow textiles (2016)
- Kyosev, Y:, Mahltig, B., Schwarz-Pfeiffer, A. (Eds) Narrow and Smart Textiles, Springer, 2018
- Mahltig, Boris; Kyosev, Yordan, eds. (2018). Inorganic and composite fibers: production, properties, and applications. Duxford, United Kingdom: Woodhead Publishing is an imprint of Elsevier. ISBN 9780081022290.

=== Journals ===
- Since 2017, Editor-in-Chief of JEF Journal of Engineered Fibers and Fabrics, published by SAGE.
- Since 2020, founder and co-Editor-in-Chief of the journal Communications in Development and Assembling of Textile Products

== Awards ==
- Alexander von Humboldt Research Fellowship (2005)
- Niederrhein Book Award for "Braiding technology for textiles"(2017)
