= Roy Amara =

American researcher and scientist (1925-2007)

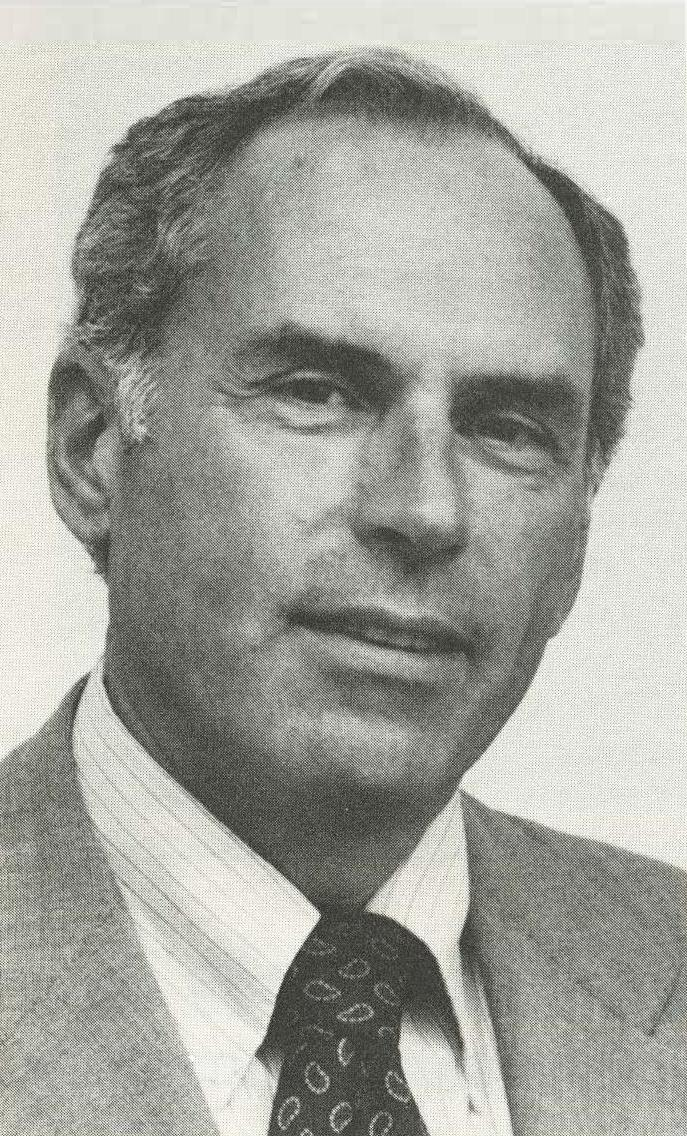
- Amara c. 1980
- Born: Roy Charles Amara; 7 April 1925
- Died: 31 December 2007 (aged 82)
- Education: MIT; Harvard University; Stanford University
- Known for: Amara's law
- Spouse: Margaret Frances Terestre (m. 1949)
- Children: 3
- Scientific career
- Fields: Futurism
- Workplaces: SRI International, IFTF

Roy Charles Amara (7 April 1925 – 31 December 2007) was an American researcher, scientist, futurist and president of the Institute for the Future best known for coining Amara's law on the effect of technology. Prior to pursuing higher education, he worked as an Electronics Technician for the United States Navy in WWII. He held a BS in Management, an MS in the Arts and Sciences, and a PhD in Systems Engineering, and also worked at the Stanford Research Institute.

== Amara's law ==
His adage, coined in 1978, about forecasting the effects of technology has become known as Amara's law and states:

We tend to overestimate the effect of a technology in the short run and underestimate the effect in the long run.

The law has been used in explaining nanotechnology.

The reasoning behind this quote is because of the intense reaction to the development of something new and innovative; but when that technology doesn't immediately affect our day to day lives, or there isn't a major impact in the world it is quickly forgotten about. His law has been important for companies to keep them grounded and to not spend on unproven, attractive technologies.

== Selected bibliography ==
=== Books ===
- Amara, Roy; Boucher, Wayne I. (1977). National Science Foundation (ed.). The study of the future: an agenda for research. Washington, D.C.: General Post Office. OCLC 3200105.
- Amara, Roy; Lipinski, Andrew J. (1983). Business planning for an uncertain future: scenarios & strategies. New York: Pergamon Press. ISBN 9780080275451.
- Amara, Roy; Morrison, J. Ian; Schmid, Gregory (1988). Looking ahead at American health care. Washington, D.C.: McGraw-Hill, Healthcare Information Center. ISBN 9780070013841.
- Amara, Roy; Institute for the future (2003). Health and health care 2010: the forecast, the challenge (2nd ed.). Hoboken, New Jersey: John Wiley & Sons. ISBN 9780470932513.

=== Reports ===
- Amara, Roy; Institute for the future (1972). A framework for national science policy analysis (Report). Menlo Park, California: Institute for the Future. OCLC 4484161. P-18. "Reprinted from IEEE transactions on systems, man, and cybernetics, v. SMC-2, no. 1 January 1972"
- Amara, Roy; Institute for the future (1972). Toward a framework for national goals and policy research (Report). Menlo Park, California: Institute for the Future. OCLC 11724396. "Reprinted from IEEE Transactions on systems, man and cybernetics, v. SMC-2, no. 5 November 1972"
- Amara, Roy; Institute for the future (1972). The social responsibilities of business (Report). Menlo Park, California: Institute for the Future. OCLC 5744644. "Prepared for the White House Conference on the Industrial World Ahead, Washington, D.C., 2–9 February 1972"
- Amara, Roy; Institute for the future (1973). Draft summaries of four workshops on the social impact of the computer (Report). Menlo Park, California: Institute for the Future. OCLC 709544477.
- Amara, Roy; Lipinski, Andrew J.; Institute for the future (1974). Strategic planning: penetrating the corporate barriers (Report). Menlo Park, California: Institute for the Future. OCLC 4349610.
- Amara, Roy; World Future Society (1975). The next 25 years: crises and challenges (Report). Menlo Park, California: World Future Society. OCLC 3693807. P-31. "Presented at the World Future Society Second General Assembly Plenary Session, June 2, 1975"
- Amara, Roy; Institute for the future (1975). Some methods of futures research (Report). Menlo Park, California: Institute for the Future. OCLC 2456542.
- Amara, Roy; Institute for the future (1975). Emerging societal issues: some suggestions for research (Report). Menlo Park, California: Institute for the Future. OCLC 17817243. WP-22.
- Amara, Roy; Institute for the future (1978). The U.S. in the decade ahead: an inventory of resources: American Vocational Association national convention, 4 December, 1978 (Report). Menlo Park, California: Institute for the Future. OCLC 7527420. P-72.
- Amara, Roy; Lipinski, Hubert; Spangler, Kathleen; Institute for the future (1978). Communication needs in computer modeling (Report). Menlo Park, California: Institute for the Future. OCLC 7511471. P-67. Published in Conference proceedings 1978 Winter Simulation Conference (WSC 1978). Pdf.
- Amara, Roy; Institute for the future (1978). The future of voluntarism: meeting changing societal needs (Report). Menlo Park, California: Institute for the Future. OCLC 7293285. P-69.
- Amara, Roy; Institute for the future (1978). Planning, futures and the skeptics (Report). Menlo Park, California: Institute for the Future. OCLC 6661254.
- Amara, Roy; Institute for the future (1978). Toward understanding the social impact of computers (Report). Menlo Park, California: Institute for the Future. OCLC 1166342. R-29.
- Amara, Roy; Institute for the future (1980). The future of management: ten shapers of management in the '80s (Report). Menlo Park, California: Institute for the Future. OCLC 8390527. P-80.
- Amara, Roy; Institute for the future (1980). Imperatives for tomorrow: the I's have it: images, institutions, involvement (Report). Menlo Park, California: Institute for the Future. OCLC 7917815. P-87.
- Amara, Roy; Institute for the future (1980). The futures field (Report). Menlo Park, California: Institute for the Future. OCLC 7919207. P-95.
