= ELAC Action Plans =

Intergovernmental strategy

General information
- Status: Active
- Type: Intergovernmental initiative
- Established: 2005
- Region: Latin America and the Caribbean
- Coordinating body: United Nations Economic Commission for Latin America and the Caribbean (ECLAC)
- Focus: Digital development and information society
- Website: elac.cepal.org

eLAC is an intergovernmental strategy in international relations that frames information and communications technologies (ICTs) as tools for economic development and social inclusion in Latin America and the Caribbean. It is based on a public-private sector partnership andaligns with broader international frameworks, including the Millennium Development Goals (MDGs), the World Summit on the Information Society (WSIS), and the Sustainable Development Goals (SDGs).

The initiative is implemented through a series of short-term action plans with defined qualitative and quantitative objectives, which are periodically updated to reflect changing priorities. The eight consecutive plans have evolved over five different paradigms of the digital age.

== Strategy for the Information Society in Latin America and the Caribbean ==
The governments of Latin America and the Caribbean have asked the United Nations Economic Commission for Latin America and the Caribbean (UNECLAC) to assist them with the international private-public sector follow up of the plan.

== Objectives of the eLAC Action Plans ==
The eLAC Action Plans are intended to support coordination and cooperation among public and private sector stakeholders, with the aim of reducing duplication of efforts and strengthening regional initiatives through the exchange of practices at a regional level.

They provide a framework for the development of national strategies and initiatives in areas related to the information society, including the establishment of action lines and indicators to monitor progress.

The plans also seek to support policy development by facilitating analysis and knowledge-sharing on relevant issues. In addition, they aim to align regional priorities with broader global developments while taking into account regional contexts and needs.

== History ==
The eLAC development agenda has evolved over time in response to changing regional and global priorities in digital development. Early phases (2005–2008) focused on the development of the information society, followed by an emphasis on broadband and the digital economy (2010–2013). Subsequent phases addressed connectivity and production (2015–2018), productive and sustainable development (2020–2022), and more recently, emerging areas such as artificial intelligence from 2024 onward.

The agenda has been implemented through a series of action plans covering specific periods. These include eLAC2007 (2005–2007), which set out 30 goals and 70 activities; eLAC2010 (2008–2010), with 83 goals; eLAC2015 (2010–2015), with 24 goals; eLAC2018 (2015–2018), with 23 goals; eLAC2020 (2018–2020), outlining 7 broad goals; eLAC2022 (2020–2022), structured around 9 goal areas; eLAC2024 (2022–2024), with 9 policy goals; and eLAC2026 (2024–2026), organized around thematic axes and goal areas.

== Political background ==
The eLAC Regional Action Plan emerged from a series of international and regional policy discussions on the role of information and communication technologies (ICTs) in development.

In 2000, following deliberations within the Economic and Social Council of the United Nations (ECOSOC) on the role of information technology in a global knowledge-based economy, countries in Latin America and the Caribbean adopted the Florianópolis Declaration. This declaration emphasized the importance of ICTs for development and highlighted the need for public policy to address issues such as the digital divide.

Between 2001 and 2005, regional efforts were further shaped through participation in the World Summit on the Information Society (WSIS) and related preparatory meetings. During this period, initiatives such as the Bávaro Declaration (2003) and the Quito Plan of Action (2002) contributed to the development of a regional perspective on ICT policy, including areas such as internet governance and digital inclusion.

Building on the existing political consensus in the region, the governments of the countries comprising it put forward proposals at the meetings of the Preparatory Committee for the second phase of the Preparatory Committee for the second phase of the World Summit on the Information Society for the development of an Action Plan for Latin America and the Caribbean for the 2005–2007 period (eLAC2007), intending that this should be the first step along the road to 2015.

The second step was forged with the approval of the second Regional Action Plan (eLAC2010), which is embodied in the San Salvador Commitment, approved during the II Ministerial Conference on the Information Society, held in El Salvador, 6–8 February 2008.

In May 2018, the most recent Digital Agenda for Latin America and the Caribbean has been approved in Cartagena, Colombia eLAC2020 is clearly aligned with the Sustainable Development Goals of the United Nations, and therefore expands its role in translating global ambitions into regional (which it had previous done for the Millennium Development Goals).

== Impact evaluation and monitoring ==
A characteristic feature of the eLAC Action Plans is their use of ongoing monitoring mechanisms based on statistical indicators. These have been used to track progress and assess policy implementation over time. The United Nations Economic Commission for Latin America and the Caribbean (ECLAC), acting as the technical secretariat, has produced a series of monitoring reports supported by data, including Benchmarking WSIS in LAC (2005), Situating eLAC2007 (2005), Monitoring eLAC2007 (2007), Monitoring eLAC2010 (2010), Monitoring eLAC2015 (2013), and Monitoring eLAC2018 (2018).

The initial eLAC2007 Action Plan introduced structural elements that distinguished it from comparable initiatives. Its goals were defined either as quantifiable targets or as action-oriented measures with specified steps, facilitating evaluation. In addition, the plan functioned as a coordination framework for public and private sector activities, rather than as a mechanism for implementing projects directly. Regional initiatives such as RedGeALC, RedCLARA, and OSILAC were associated with specific goals within this framework.

== See also ==
- Delphi method
- Development communication
