= Olaf Helmer =

German-American logician and futurologist (1910–2011)

Olaf Helmer (June 4, 1910 – April 14, 2011) was a German-American logician and futurologist. He was a researcher at the RAND Corporation from 1946 to 1968 and a co-founder of the Institute for the Future.

== Biography ==
Born in Berlin, Helmer studied mathematics and logic at the University of Berlin. He earned his doctorate there in 1934, under direction from philosopher Hans Reichenbach. That year he moved to London where he began a second doctoral study, on Russell's paradox, under direction from Susan Stebbing at the University of London. Russell himself was one of Helmer's examiners.

Helmer moved to the United States in 1937, first working as a research assistant to Rudolf Carnap at the University of Chicago, then as a teacher of mathematics.

Beginning 1944, Helmer was involved in work for the National Defense Research Council under John Davis Williams (1909-1964). He would join Williams at the newly formed RAND Corporation in 1946.

Helmer's interests later turned towards forecasting and prediction. Collaborating with colleagues Norman Dalkey<ref>Norman Crolee Dalkey (1915-2004) and Nicholas Rescher, his work led to the development of the Delphi method forecasting technique, also known as ETE (Estimate/Talk/Estimate).

In 1968, Helmer left RAND to co-found the Institute for the Future. In 1973 he was appointed Professor of Futuristics at the School of Business Administration at the University of Southern California.
