= Delphi method =

Interactive forecasting method

The Delphi method, or Delphi technique (/ˈdɛlfaɪ/ DEL-fy; also known as Estimate–Talk–Estimate, or ETE), is a structured communication technique, or method, originally developed as a systematic, interactive forecasting method that relies on a panel of experts. Delphi has been widely used for business forecasting and has certain advantages over another structured forecasting approach, prediction markets.

Delphi can also be used to help reach expert consensus and develop professional guidelines. It is used for such purposes in many health-related fields, including clinical medicine, public health, and research.

Delphi is based on the principle that forecasts (or decisions) from a structured group of individuals are more accurate than those from unstructured groups. In classic applications, experts answer questionnaires in two or more discrete rounds. However, modern Real-Time Delphi formats often utilize a continuous, roundless interaction. After each round, a facilitator, or change agent, provides an anonymised summary of the experts' forecasts from the previous round as well as the reasons they provided for their judgments. Thus, experts are encouraged to revise their earlier answers in light of the replies of other members of their panel. It is believed that during this process the range of the answers will decrease and the group will converge towards the "correct" answer. Finally, the process is stopped after a predefined stopping criterion (e.g., number of rounds, achievement of consensus, stability of results), while traditional stopping criteria aimed for statistical convergence (e.g., mean or median scores), contemporary methodology prioritizes mapping the landscape of expert opinion, exploring qualitative reasoning, and identifying valid minority views rather than forcing an artificial consensus.

In a Delphi consensus and in research, reaching consensus does not necessarily show that the correct answer has been found but only that agreement has been reached among the experts. The method has been critiqued for emphasizing consensus in ways that may limit participant discussion and explanations. Alternative methods, such as focus groups, prioritize discussion and elaboration. In face-to-face discussions, there is always the disadvantage that strong personalities may influence or dictate the direction of the conversation. The Delphi method is often presented as a way to reduce individual control by collecting responses independently.

Special attention has to be paid to the formulation of the Delphi theses and the definition and selection of the experts in order to avoid methodological weaknesses that severely threaten the validity and reliability of the results. For example, care must be taken to ensure that the panelists have the requisite subject-matter expertise and that the more domineering participants do not overwhelm weaker-willed participants—the former may be less inclined to change their minds, or the latter more motivated to fit in, and either case could inhibit reaching true consensus.

== History ==
The name Delphi derives from the Oracle of Delphi, although the authors of the method were unhappy with the oracular connotation of the name, "smacking a little of the occult". The Delphi method assumes that group judgments are more valid than individual judgments.

The Delphi method was developed at the beginning of the Cold War to forecast the impact of technology on warfare. In 1944, General Henry H. Arnold ordered the creation of a report for the U.S. Army Air Corps on the future technological capabilities that might be used by the military.

Different approaches were tried, but the shortcomings of traditional forecasting methods, such as theoretical approach, quantitative models or trend extrapolation, quickly became apparent in areas where precise scientific laws had not been established yet. To combat these shortcomings, the Delphi method was developed at Project RAND by Olaf Helmer, Norman Dalkey, and Nicholas Rescher. It has been used ever since, together with various modifications and reformulations, such as the Imen-Delphi procedure.

Experts were asked to give their opinion on the probability, frequency, and intensity of possible enemy attacks. Other experts could anonymously give feedback. This process was repeated several times until a consensus emerged.

In 2021, a cross-disciplinary study by Beiderbeck et al. focused on new directions and advancements of the Delphi method, including Real-time Delphi formats. The authors provide a methodological toolbox for designing Delphi surveys including among others sentiment analyses of the field of psychology.

== Key characteristics ==
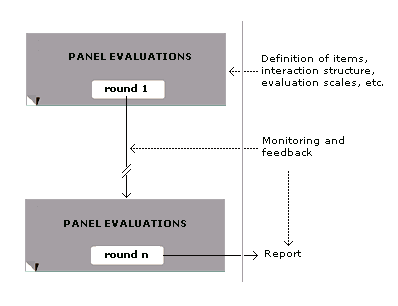
The Delphi method communication structure

The following key characteristics of the Delphi method help the participants to focus on the issues at hand and separate Delphi from other methodologies: in this technique a panel of experts is drawn from both inside and outside the organisation. The panel consists of experts having knowledge of the area requiring decision making. Each expert is asked to make anonymous predictions.

=== Anonymity of the participants ===
Usually all participants remain anonymous. Their identity is not revealed, even after the completion of the final report. This prevents the authority, personality, or reputation of some participants from dominating others in the process. Arguably, it also frees participants (to some extent) from their personal biases, minimizes the "bandwagon effect" or "halo effect", allows free expression of opinions, encourages open critique, and facilitates admission of errors when revising earlier judgments.

=== Structuring of information flow ===
The initial contributions from the experts are collected in the form of answers to questionnaires and their comments to these answers. In traditional formats, a panel director manually processed information and filtered irrelevant content. Today, modern RTD platforms automate data aggregation, allowing participants to view live distributions of group opinions and filter arguments organically through community upvoting or tagging systems. This avoids the negative effects of face-to-face panel discussions and solves the usual problems of group dynamics.

=== Regular feedback ===
The Delphi method allows participants to comment on the responses of others, the progress of the panel as a whole, and to revise their own forecasts and opinions in real time. Modern platforms achieve this using dynamic visual aids, such as live histograms overlaid directly on rating sliders, to provide instant cognitive feedback. This allows participants to see the evolving collective view immediately without waiting for a facilitator to compile a periodic report.

=== Role of the facilitator ===
The person coordinating the Delphi method is usually known as a facilitator or Leader, and facilitates the responses of their panel of experts, who are selected for a reason, usually that they hold knowledge on an opinion or view. The facilitator sends out questionnaires, surveys etc. and if the panel of experts accept, they follow instructions and present their views. Responses are collected and analyzed, then common and conflicting viewpoints are identified. In modern applications, the facilitator acts more as a dashboard moderator than an administrator. By monitoring live indicators, the facilitator probes for qualitative justifications of outlier opinions and stimulates constructive debate, focusing on understanding the logic behind disparate forecasts rather than merely building consensus.

During the past decades, facilitators have used many different measures and thresholds to measure the degree of consensus or dissent. A comprehensive literature review and summary is compiled in an article by von der Gracht.

== Applications ==
=== Use in forecasting ===
First applications of the Delphi method were in the field of science and technology forecasting. The objective of the method was to combine expert opinions on likelihood and expected development time, of the particular technology, in a single indicator. One of the first such reports, prepared in 1964 by Gordon and Helmer, assessed the direction of long-term trends in science and technology development, covering such topics as scientific breakthroughs, population control, automation, space progress, war prevention and weapon systems. Other forecasts of technology were dealing with vehicle-highway systems, industrial robots, intelligent internet, broadband connections, and technology in education.

Later the Delphi method was applied in other places, especially those related to public policy issues, such as economic trends, health and education. It was also applied successfully and with high accuracy in business forecasting. For example, in one case reported by Basu and Schroeder (1977), the Delphi method predicted the sales of a new product during the first two years with inaccuracy of 3–4% compared with actual sales. Quantitative methods produced errors of 10–15%, and traditional unstructured forecast methods had errors of about 20%. (This is only one example; the overall accuracy of the technique is mixed.)

The Delphi method has also been used as a tool to implement multi-stakeholder approaches for participative policy-making in developing countries. The governments of Latin America and the Caribbean have successfully used the Delphi method as an open-ended public-private sector approach to identify the most urgent challenges for their regional ICT-for-development eLAC Action Plans. As a result, governments have widely acknowledged the value of collective intelligence from civil society, academic and private sector participants of the Delphi, especially in a field of rapid change, such as technology policies.

=== Use in patent participation identification ===
In the early 1980s Jackie Awerman of Jackie Awerman Associates, Inc. designed a modified Delphi method for identifying the roles of various contributors to the creation of a patent-eligible product. (Epsilon Corporation, Chemical Vapor Deposition Reactor) The results were then used by patent attorneys to determine bonus distribution percentage to the general satisfaction of all team members.

=== Use in policy-making ===
From the 1970s, the use of the Delphi technique in public policy-making introduces a number of methodological innovations. In particular:

- the need to examine several types of items (not only forecasting items but, typically, issue items, goal items, and option items) leads to introducing different evaluation scales which are not used in the standard Delphi. These often include desirability, feasibility (technical and political) and probability, which the analysts can use to outline different scenarios: the desired scenario (from desirability), the potential scenario (from feasibility) and the expected scenario (from probability);
- the complexity of issues posed in public policy-making tends to increase weighting of panelists' arguments, such as soliciting pros and cons for each item along with new items for panel consideration;
- likewise, methods measuring panel evaluations tend to increase sophistication such as multi-dimensional scaling.

Further innovations come from the use of computer-based (and later web-based) Delphi conferences. According to Turoff and Hiltz, in computer-based Delphis:

- the iteration structure used in the paper Delphis, which is divided into three or more discrete rounds, can be replaced by a process of continuous (roundless) interaction, enabling panelists to change their evaluations at any time;
- the statistical group response can be updated in real-time, and shown whenever a panelist provides a new evaluation.

According to Bolognini, web-based Delphis offer two further possibilities, relevant in the context of interactive policy-making and e-democracy. These are:

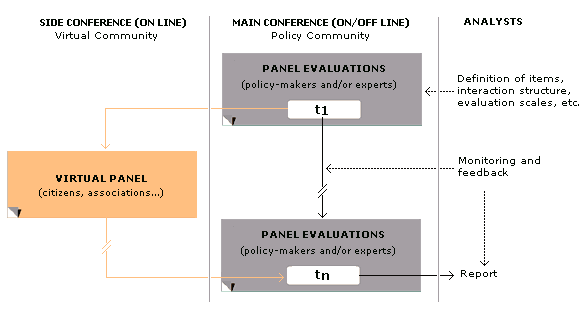
A web-based communication structure (Hyperdelphi)

- the involvement of a large number of participants,
- the use of two or more panels representing different groups (such as policy-makers, experts, citizens), which the administrator can give tasks reflecting their diverse roles and expertise, and make them interact within ad hoc communication structures. For example, the policy community members (policy-makers and experts) may interact as part of the main conference panel, while they receive inputs from a virtual community (citizens, associations etc.) involved in a side conference. These web-based variable communication structures, which he calls Hyperdelphi (HD), are designed to make Delphi conferences "more fluid and adapted to the hypertextual and interactive nature of digital communication".

One successful example of a (partially) web-based policy Delphi is the five-round Delphi exercise (with 1,454 contributions) for the creation of the eLAC Action Plans in Latin America. It is believed to be the most extensive online participatory policy-making foresight exercise in the history of intergovernmental processes in the developing world at this time. In addition to the specific policy guidance provided, the authors list the following lessons learned: "(1) the potential of Policy Delphi methods to introduce transparency and accountability into public decision-making, especially in developing countries; (2) the utility of foresight exercises to foster multi-agency networking in the development community; (3) the usefulness of embedding foresight exercises into established mechanisms of representative democracy and international multilateralism, such as the United Nations; (4) the potential of online tools to facilitate participation in resource-scarce developing countries; and (5) the resource-efficiency stemming from the scale of international foresight exercises, and therefore its adequacy for resource-scarce regions."

=== Use in health settings ===
The Delphi technique is widely used to help reach expert consensus in health-related settings. For example, it is frequently employed in the development of medical guidelines and protocols.

==== Public health ====
Some examples of its application in public health contexts include metabolic dysfunction–associated steatotic liver disease (MASLD), iodine deficiency disorders, building responsive health systems for communities affected by migration, the role of health systems in advancing well-being for those living with HIV, on policies and interventions to reduce harmful gambling, on the regulation of electronic cigarettes and on recommendations to end the COVID-19 pandemic.

==== Reporting guidelines ====
Use of the Delphi method in the development of guidelines for the reporting of health research is recommended, especially for experienced developers. Since this advice was made in 2010, two systematic reviews have found that fewer than 30% of published reporting guidelines incorporated Delphi methods into the development process.

=== Online Delphi systems ===
To mitigate participant fatigue, modern Delphi interfaces have evolved from linear questionnaires to more dynamic designs, visualising the whole scope of the study in one dashboard and thus prioritizing respondent attention.

A number of Delphi forecasts are conducted using web sites that allow the process to be conducted in real-time. For instance, the TechCast Project uses a panel of 100 experts worldwide to forecast breakthroughs in all fields of science and technology. Another example is the Horizon Project, where educational futurists collaborate online using the Delphi method to come up with the technological advancements to look out for in education for the next few years.

== Variations ==
Traditionally the Delphi method has aimed at a consensus of the most probable future by iteration. Other versions, such as the Policy Delphi, offer decision support methods aiming at structuring and discussing the diverse views of the preferred future.

In Europe, more recent web-based experiments have used the Delphi method as a communication technique for interactive decision-making and e-democracy.

The Argument Delphi, developed by Osmo Kuusi, focuses on ongoing discussion and finding relevant arguments rather than focusing on the output. The Disaggregative Policy Delphi, developed by Petri Tapio, uses cluster analysis as a systematic tool to construct various scenarios of the future in the latest Delphi round. The respondent's view on the probable and the preferable future are dealt with as separate cases. The computerization of Argument Delphi is relatively difficult because of several problems like argument resolution, argument aggregation and argument evaluation. The computerization of Argument Delphi, developed by Sadi Evren Seker, proposes solutions to such problems.

A fast-track Delphi was developed to provide consensual expert opinion on the state of scientific knowledge in public health crises. It can provide results within three weeks, while the conventional Delphi can take several months (sometimes years).

== Accuracy ==
Today the Delphi method is a widely accepted forecasting tool and has been used successfully for thousands of studies in areas varying from technology forecasting to drug abuse. Overall the track record of the Delphi method is mixed. There have been many cases when the method produced poor results. Still, some authors attribute this to poor application of the method and not to the weaknesses of the method itself. The RAND Methodological Guidance for Conducting and Critically Appraising Delphi Panels is a manual for doing Delphi research which provides guidance for doing research and offers an appraisal tool. This manual gives guidance on best practices that will help to avoid, or mitigate, potential drawbacks of Delphi Method Research; it also helps to understand the confidence that can be given to study results.

It must also be realized that in areas such as science and technology forecasting, the degree of uncertainty is so great that exact and always correct predictions are impossible, so a high degree of error is to be expected. An important challenge for the method is ensuring sufficiently knowledgeable panelists. If panelists are misinformed about a topic, the use of Delphi may only add confidence to their ignorance.

Selecting a panel requires avoiding common cognitive traps. For instance, the practice of weighting responses based on a participant's self-assessed expertise is controversial, as it may skew results toward overconfidence rather than the merits of the arguments.

One of the initial problems of the method was its inability to make complex forecasts with multiple factors. Potential future outcomes were usually considered as if they had no effect on each other. Later on, several extensions to the Delphi method were developed to address this problem, such as cross impact analysis, that takes into consideration the possibility that the occurrence of one event may change probabilities of other events covered in the survey. Still the Delphi method can be used most successfully in forecasting single scalar indicators.

=== Delphi vs. prediction markets ===
Delphi has characteristics similar to prediction markets as both are structured approaches that aggregate diverse opinions from groups. Yet, there are differences that may be decisive for their relative applicability for different problems.

Some advantages of prediction markets derive from the possibility to provide incentives for participation.

1. They can motivate people to participate over a long period of time and to reveal their true beliefs.
2. They aggregate information automatically and instantly incorporate new information in the forecast.
3. Participants do not have to be selected and recruited manually by a facilitator. They themselves decide whether to participate if they think their private information is not yet incorporated in the forecast.

Delphi seems to have these advantages over prediction markets:

1. Participants reveal their reasoning
2. It is easier to maintain confidentiality
3. Potentially quicker forecasts if experts are readily available.
4. Delphi is applicable in situations where the bets involved might affect the value of the currency used in bets (e.g. a bet on the collapse of the dollar made in dollars might have distorted odds).

More recent research has also focused on combining both, the Delphi technique and prediction markets. More specifically, in a research study at Deutsche Börse elements of the Delphi method had been integrated into a prediction market.

== See also ==
- Computer supported brainstorming
- DARPA's Policy Analysis Market
- Horizon scanning
- Nominal group technique
- Planning poker
- Q methodology
- Reference class forecasting
- Wideband delphi
- The Wisdom of Crowds
