= Structured communication =

Method of sharing information

Structured communication is a term used across a variety of disciplines to describe frameworks for interaction between individuals or machines. Although these frameworks are primarily designed to reduce ambiguity, increased efficiency is often cited as a secondary benefit. The concept has existed since at least 1971, when it was demonstrated to be an effective method of conflict resolution for married couples.

== Examples ==
A structured communication program was initiated amongst healthcare workers in British Columbia, Canada, following an agreement between employees and employers in 2006. A 2007 study researched the application of structured communication to End-Point Projection theory, which could allow for the development of web services that are able to adapt to unknown channels or participants. At least one company has suggested that research tools such as surveys, polls, and quizzes are a form of structured communication as well.

== Limitations ==
Student teaching is one area in which structured communication was shown to be detrimental, as student teachers using structured communication were less efficacious than those who did not. This could be because structured communication is designed to place limits on some aspect of communication, such as questions, answers, participants, or channels, in order to guide communication to a desired outcome. These limitations could limit knowledge transfer in a teaching environment.

== See also ==
- Communication sciences
- Group dynamics
- Inquiry-based learning
- Organizational communication
- Social psychology
