= Hochschule Niederrhein =

Niederrhein University of Applied Sciences
- Hochschule Niederrhein
- Former name: Fachhochschule Niederrhein
- Motto: Hochschule Niederrhein — Dein Weg
- Motto in English: Niederrhein University of Applied Sciences — Your path
- Established: 1971
- Academic affiliations: Franco-German University; Hochschulallianz für den Mittelstand (University alliance for SMEs)
- Chancellor: Fabienne Köller-Marek
- President: Susanne Meyer
- Academic staff: 285 (2023)
- Administrative staff: 331 (2023)
- Students: 13.085 (Winter term 2024/25)
- Location: Krefeld and Mönchengladbach, North Rhine-Westphalia, Germany; 51.3166°N 6.5705°E
- Website: hs-niederrhein.com

The Niederrhein University of Applied Sciences / Hochschule Niederrhein (until 2001, Fachhochschule Niederrhein), has its headquarters including the presidium and administration in Krefeld; the departments are spread over the two campuses in Krefeld and one in Mönchengladbach, Germany.

== History ==
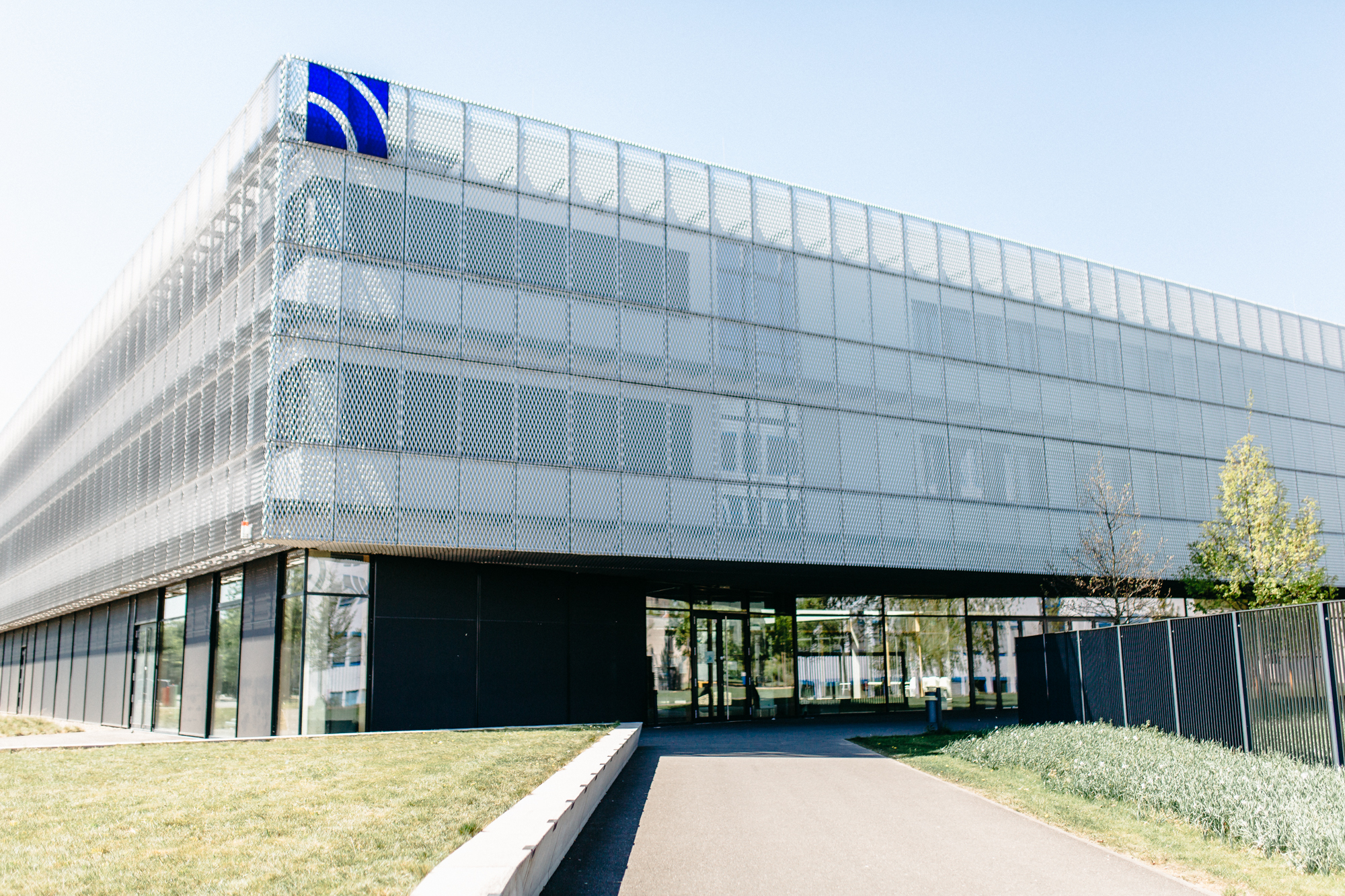
Building J Hochschule Niederrhein at Campus Krefeld South

=== Predecessor institutions ===
The predecessors of the Niederrhein University of Applied Sciences include, amongst others, former institutions of Krefeld, Mönchengladbach, Aachen, Cologne, and Bielefeld. In 1855, the Krefeld Higher Weaving School was established at the initiative of the Krefeld Chamber of Commerce to address the growing demand for training facilities for the expanding silk industry in the city.

In 1901, the Prussian Higher Technical School for the Textile Industry was founded in Mönchengladbach. The Handicrafts and Applied Arts School was established in Krefeld in 1904, which later evolved into the School of Applied Arts—now part of the Faculty of Design. In 1942, the Textile Engineering School in Aachen was founded, which later became part of the newly established Niederrhein University of Applied Sciences. From 1 August 1944 until the end of World War II, no classes were held in Krefeld.

Between 1945 and 1949, the Textile Engineering School in Krefeld, the Textile Engineering School in Mönchengladbach, and the Handicrafts and Applied Arts School in Krefeld were rebuilt.

After the war, the state government promoted the establishment of engineering schools, leading to proposals for schools in East Westphalia (Bielefeld), South Westphalia (Siegen), and a third location in the western part of the state. The cities of Düsseldorf, Mönchengladbach, and Krefeld submitted applications. The cabinet subsequently chose Krefeld, and in 1958, the State Engineering School Krefeld was founded. The university departments of Mechanical Engineering, Process Engineering, Electrical Engineering, and Computer Science developed during this time. In 1962, the State Higher School of Business was established in Mönchengladbach.

Prior to this, there had been a push from the state government for the establishment of institutions at various locations, but the Minister-President Franz Meyers, from Mönchengladbach, supported the establishment in Mönchengladbach. Between 1968 and 1969, protests and strikes increased in the predecessor institutions of the Niederrhein University of Applied Sciences, with students demanding university status, democratic structures, and recognition of their degrees. During the strike term, the Düsseldorf state parliament passed a law presented by the minister of education to convert engineering schools into universities of applied sciences by 1971. Consequently, a planning committee was established by Science Minister Johannes Rau to prepare for the founding of the Niederrhein University of Applied Sciences. At the end of the preparations, it was decided to merge the two locations in Krefeld and Mönchengladbach and to divide the faculties between them.

=== Foundation and further development ===
The Niederrhein University of Applied Sciences was founded on 1 August 1971 as Fachhochschule Niederrhein with 3,660 students, resulting from the merger of eight higher technical colleges, three engineering schools, and the Krefeld School of Applied Arts in the Krefeld-Mönchengladbach area. The student population increased over the years: starting with 3,660 enrolled students; by 1978, this number had risen to over 5,000; and during the 1989/90 semester, it exceeded 10,000. In the winter semester of 2021/22, approximately 14,200 students were registered. Two faculties, Nutrition and Home Economics and Applied Social Sciences, were newly established in Mönchengladbach at the university's founding. The Faculty of Business in Mönchengladbach and the architects of the Faculty of Design transferred to Düsseldorf University of Applied Sciences.

The main building of Niederrhein University of Applied Sciences in Mönchengladbach was registered as a heritage site under number W 017 on 11 January 1988.

In 1995, the Faculty of Industrial Engineering was established, offering a degree in Industrial Engineering and Logistics Management. In 1997, a new curriculum for healthcare was developed, integrating elements from existing faculties. By the winter semester of 2010, this area became an independent faculty. In 1999, the first bachelor's and master's degree programmes were launched.

In 2001, the university changed its name to Hochschule Niederrhein (Niederrhein University of Applied Science). In 2010, it joined the National Code for International Students at German Higher Education Institutions, as established by the German Rectors' Conference, which committed to enhancing services for international students. Since the winter semester of 2015, the trial study programme in Craft Management has been available, making the university one of the first to offer such a course. In 2016, the university was certified as family-friendly.

In compliance with the reformed German Midwifery Act, the university has been training midwives since 2021. In 2022, the university signed the Diversity Charter. A Bachelor's degree in Applied Psychology has been offered since the winter semester 24/25.

After the University Assembly in March 2025, it was announced that Thomas Grünewald would be replaced in his position as President in December 2025. The scientist and jurist Susanne Meyer was elected as the new President.

== Structure ==
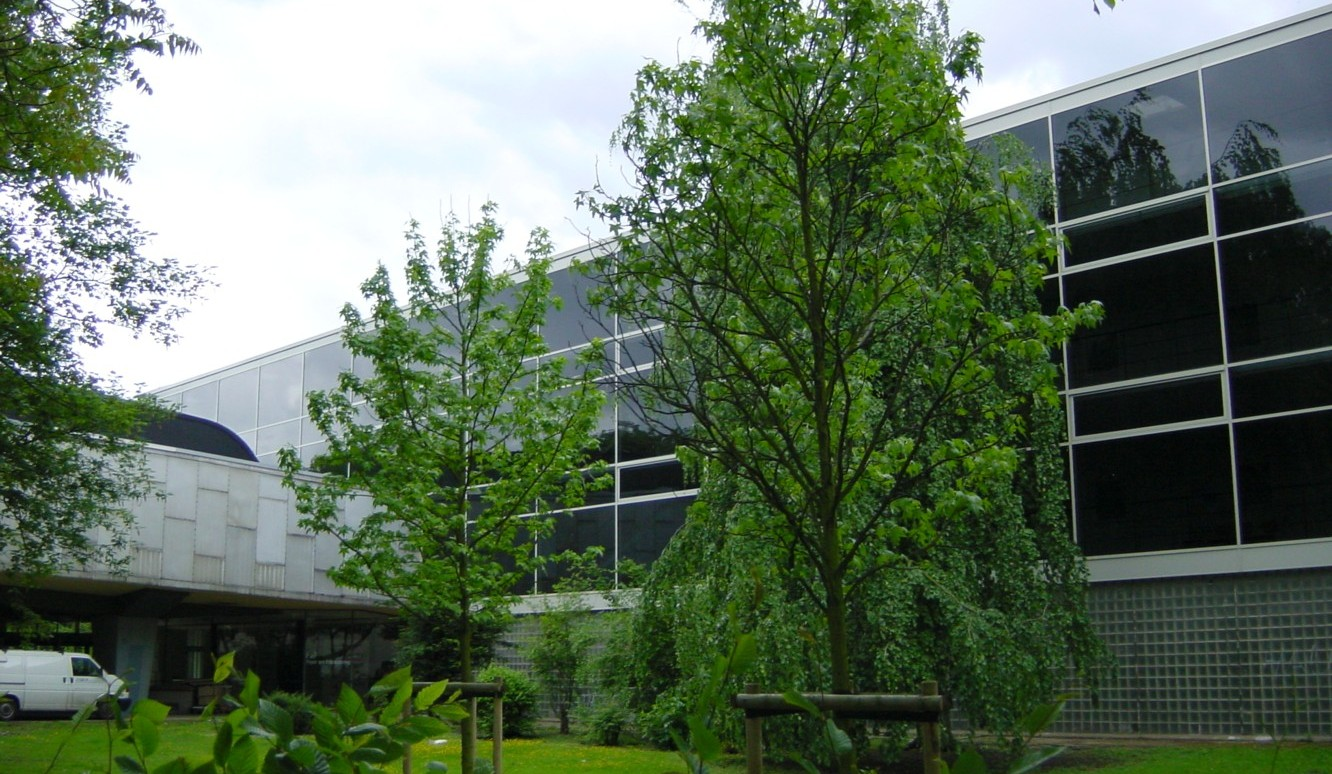
University building on Frankenring, Krefeld

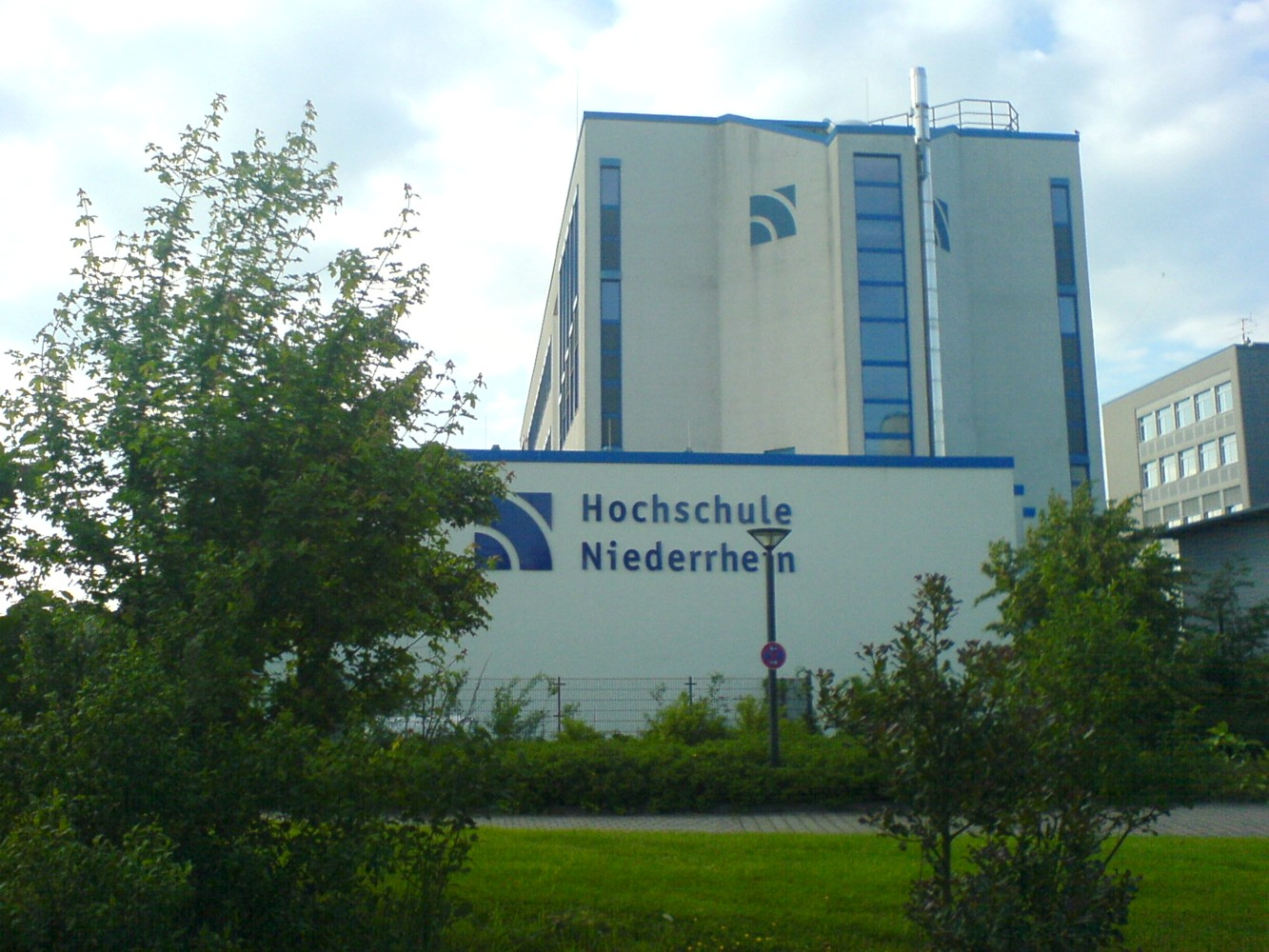
University building on Reinarzstraße, Krefeld

Niederrhein University of Applied Sciences offers a total of 78 bachelor's and 34 master's programmes, available in full-time, part-time, dual, and work-study formats. On the Krefeld West campus, there were 1,231 enrolled students in 2023, while the Krefeld South campus hosted 3,619 students. The Mönchengladbach campus had 7,953 students, bringing the total student population to over 12,000 in 2023. As of 2023, the Faculty of Business Administration and Economics is the largest faculty, with 3,676 students. In Krefeld, the Faculty of Electrical Engineering and Computer Science is the largest, with 1,284 students.

=== Departments ===
- Faculty Chemistry, Krefeld Campus
- Faculty Design, Krefeld Campus
- Faculty Engineering & Computer Science, Krefeld Campus
- Faculty Food and Nutrition Sciences, Mönchengladbach Campus
- Faculty Applied Social Sciences, Mönchengladbach Campus
- Faculty Textile and Clothing Technology, Mönchengladbach Campus
- Faculty Business Administration and Economics, Mönchengladbach Campus
- Faculty Industrial Engineering, Krefeld Campus
- Faculty Healthcare, Krefeld Campus

==== Textile and Clothing Technology ====
The Faculty of Textile and Clothing Technology has over 2,000 students, 30 professors, 25 lecturers, and more than 30 staff members (2023). Every two years, the event MG zieht an is held on the Mönchengladbach campus, organised in collaboration with the Mönchengladbach Economic Development Agency. Also located on the campus is the state-designated Public Testing Centre for the Textile Industry, which carries out nationwide testing of personal protective equipment, textile medical products, examinations for industrial reprocessing, and hygiene assessments of textiles.

=== International ===
The Niederrhein University of Applied Sciences cooperates with 125 partner schools from 41 countries worldwide. In the winter semester 2023/24, 994 foreign students were enrolled at the university. In the winter semester 2021/2022, the university's first fully English-language degree was launched in the Faculty of Business Administration and Economics.

== Awards (Selection) ==
- 2008: Winner of the FH-Extra competition in North Rhine-Westphalia. It received €278,000 from Germany and the EU for two research projects.
- 2009: European Enterprise Award.
- 2010: Award for dual STEM degree programmes by the Ministry of Innovation of the State of North Rhine-Westphalia.
- 2012: Red Dot Junior Prize 2012 for a corporate image film.
- 2017: University Manager of the Year Award for the then president of the university, Hans-Hennig von Grüneberg. Awarded by the German newspaper Die Zeit and the Centre for Higher Education.
- 2021: Awarded as the most attractive employer in the city by the German magazine Capital.
- 2024: Awarded as the most recycling-friendly university by the German Initiative Pro Recycling Paper (IPR).

== Alumni (selection) ==
- Willi Brase, German politician (SPD)
- Horst Eckert (Janosch), German children’s book author and illustrator
- Heiko Andreas von der Gracht, German economist, futurist, and non-fiction author
- Jil Sander, German fashion designer
- Butterbro, producer of the first AI-generated song to reach the German single charts
