= Outline of futures studies =

Overview of and topical guide to futures studies

The following outline is provided as an overview of and topical guide to futures studies:

Futures studies (also called futurology) – study of postulating possible, probable, and preferable futures and the worldviews and myths that underlie them. There is a debate as to whether this discipline is an art or science. In general, it can be considered as a branch of the social sciences and parallel to the field of history. History studies the past, futures studies considers the future. Futurology (colloquially called "futures" by many of the field's practitioners) seeks to understand what is likely to continue and what could plausibly change. Part of the discipline thus seeks a systematic and pattern-based understanding of past and present, and to determine the likelihood of future events and trends.

== General concepts ==
- Accelerating change
- Calculating demand forecast accuracy
- Clarke's three laws
- Collaborative planning, forecasting, and replenishment
- Causal layered analysis
- Coolhunting
- Decision support systems
- Digital library (initiatives)
- DIKW pyramid – Harlan Cleveland
- Emerging technologies
  - List of emerging technologies
- End of civilization
- Eschatology
- Failure mode and effects analysis
- Forecasting
- Foresight
- Future
- Future Techniques
- Future energy development
- Global Consciousness Project
- Hubbert peak theory
- Interdependence
- Kardashev scale
- Kondratiev wave
- Malthusian catastrophe
- Memetics
- Moore's law
- Morphological analysis
- Neo-futurism
- Omega Point
- Optimism bias
- Planetary phase of civilization
- Planning
- Potential cultural impact of extraterrestrial contact
- Prediction
- Prediction market
- Psychohistory (fictional)
- Race of the future
- Reference class forecasting
- Risks to civilization, humans and planet Earth
- Scenario analysis
- Social network analysis
- Strategic foresight
- Systems theory
- Technological singularity
- Technology
- Technology forecasting
- Theory of constraints
- Thought experiment
- Transhumanism
- Twelve leverage points
- Ultimate fate of the universe

== Futures techniques ==
- Anticipatory thinking
- Causal layered analysis (CLA)
- Environmental scanning
- Scenario method
- Horizon scanning
- Delphi method
- Future history
- Monitoring
- Backcasting (eco-history)
- Cross-impact analysis
- Futures workshops
- Failure mode and effects analysis
- Futures wheel
- Technology roadmapping
- Social network analysis
- Systems engineering
- Trend analysis
- Morphological analysis
- Technology forecasting
- Theory U

== Organizations ==
- Association of Professional Futurists
- Bakken Museum
- Club of Rome
- Copenhagen Institute for Futures Studies
- Foundation For the Future
- Future of Humanity Institute
- Future of Life Institute
- The Futures Academy
- Global Business Network
- Global Scenario Group
- Hudson Institute
- Institute for Futures Research
- Institute for the Future
- International Institute of Forecasters
- Long Now Foundation
- NASA Institute for Advanced Concepts
- Naval Postgraduate School
- RAND Corporation
- Devi Ahilya University
- Tellus Institute
- The Millennium Project
- World Future Society
- World Futures Studies Federation

=== Research centers ===
- Copenhagen Institute for Futures Studies
- Institute for the Future, Palo Alto, California
- Tellus Institute, Boston, Massachusetts
- The Futures Academy, Dublin Institute of Technology, Ireland
- World Futures Studies Federation, world

=== Academic programs ===
- Australia: Australian Catholic University
- Australia: Swinburne University of Technology
- Argentina: Universidad Nacional de La Plata
- Australia: Curtin University of Technology
- Australia: University of the Sunshine Coast
- Canada: OCAD University
- Colombia: Universidad Externado de Colombia
- Colombia: Uniandes
- Czech Republic: Charles University of Prague
- Finland: Turku School of Economics and Business Administration
- France: CNAM
- Hungary: Corvinus University of Budapest
- India: Devi Ahilya University
- India: University of Kerala
- Italy: Gregorian University
- Mexico: Monterrey Institute of Technology
- Romania: Babeș-Bolyai University
- Russia: Moscow State University
- South Africa: Stellenbosch University
- South Korea: Korea Advanced Institute of Science and Technology
- Taiwan: Tamkang University
- Taiwan: Fo Guang University
- US: University of Hawaii (Since 1971)
- US: University of Houston (Since 2000)
- US: Stanford University
- US: Regent University

== Futurologists ==
- Alex Steffen
- Alvin Toffler
- Arthur C. Clarke
- Aurelio Peccei
- Bertrand deJouvenel
- Bill Joy
- Bruce Sterling
- Charles Babbage
- Clem Bezold
- Daniel Bell
- David Passig
- Earl Bakken
- Edgar Morin
- Erich Jantsch
- Fred Polak
- Gaston Berger
- Gerard O'Neill
- Grace Hopper
- Harlan Cleveland
- Hazel Henderson
- Herman Kahn
- Homer A. McCrerey
- Hugo de Garis
- Irma Wyman
- Jacque Fresco
- James Burke
- James Martin
- Jaron Lanier
- Jeremy Rifkin
- James Dator
- John Brunner
- John McHale
- John Naisbitt
- John Zerzan
- Kevin Warwick
- Kim Stanley Robinson
- Kirit Parikh
- Mahdi ElMandjra
- Max More
- Michael Walzer
- Natasha Vita-More
- Patrick Dixon
- Paul Raskin
- Paul Saffo
- Peter C. Bishop
- Peter Schwartz
- Ray Kurzweil
- Richard A. Slaughter
- Richard Lamb
- Robert A. Heinlein
- Robert Anton Wilson
- Robert Heilbroner
- Robert Jungk
- Robert Prechter
- Sohail Inayatullah
- Stephen Hawking
- Stewart Brand
- Strauss and Howe
- Stanislaw Lem
- Thorkil Kristensen
- Vincent Ialenti
- Wendell Bell
- Willis Harman
- Abouzar Seifi Kalestan

== Publications ==
=== Books ===
- The Age of Spiritual Machines: When Computers Exceed Human Intelligence
- Brave New World
- The Communist Manifesto
- Future Primitive
- Future Shock
- Futurewise
- The Limits to Growth
- Our Final Hour
- The Revenge of Gaia
- The Singularity Is Near: When Humans Transcend Biology
- The Skeptical Environmentalist
- The Third Wave, Alvin Toffler
- Physics of the Impossible
- Physics of the Future: How Science Will Shape Human Destiny and Our Daily Lives by the Year 2100

=== Periodicals and monographs ===
- Foresight
- Future Orientation Index
- Futures
- International Journal of Forecasting
- Journal of Futures Studies
- Technological Forecasting and Social Change

== See also ==
- Abductive reasoning
- List of futurologists
- Index of articles related to the theory of constraints
- Transhumanism
