= Transition scenario =

Transition scenarios are descriptions of future states which combine a future image with an account of the changes that would need to occur to reach that future. These two elements are often created in a two-step process where the future image is created first (envisioning) followed by an exploration of the alternative pathways available to reach the future goal (backcasting). Both these processes can use participatory techniques where participants of varying backgrounds and interests are provided with an open and supportive group environment to discuss different contributing elements and actions.

Transition scenarios are unique in type not only in terms of how they are created (process) but also their content. Their requirements are guided by transition management concepts and consider the "fundamental and irreversible change in the culture, structure and practices of a system" (Sondeijker, 2009:52,). Transition scenarios are emerging as a scenario type which is more applicable to the context of sustainable development based on their abilities to capture the complexities of system structure and innovation.

== Scenario types ==
Scenarios can then be defined as "a tool for ordering alternative future environments in which one's decision may be played out". These scenarios are based on the presumption that nobody can predict, and therefore should not try to predict the future. "The only relevant discussions about the future are those where we succeed from shifting from the question "whether something will happen" to the question "what will we do IF something happens".

Later generation scenarios focus on long time spans and preferred societal systems which are normative and explorative in nature and reflective of the structural and societal changes required in pursuing sustainability.

== Content ==
Transition scenarios are informed by transition management concepts and theories which it uses as a basis for its contents. In particular, transition scenarios consider long time frames and are both normative and explorative in nature. Their contents are predominantly centred on the following elements.

== Process ==
Transition scenarios are also process orientated focusing on the ability of different stakeholders and participants to communicate and imagine their desired future within the discussion groups. Through this participatory process participants are encouraged to change mind set and attitude to think from a long-term perspective. Specific focus on various feasible topics will increase participants' knowledge of the topic area and the alternatives available in its context. These lessons may eventually be internalised within participants resulting in a social learning process.

== See also ==
- Fairtrade Town
- Energy transition
- Global Scenario Group
- Great Transition
- Oil Depletion Analysis Centre
- Scenario analysis
- Scenario planning
- Stockholm Environment Institute
- Sustainable city
- Tellus Institute
- Transition management (governance)
- Transition economy
- Transition towns
