= Jerome C. Glenn =

American futurist (born 1945)

- Born: August 9, 1945 (age 81)
- Education: Antioch University New England
- Occupations: Director; Author; futurist; Keynote Speaker
- Known for: Futures wheel The Millennium Project

Jerome Clayton Glenn (born August 9, 1945) is an American futurist who is the executive director, co-founder, and CEO of the Millennium Project. He also served as the executive director of the American Council for the United Nations University from 1988 to 2007 and deputy director of Partnership for Productivity International, and was the co-recipient of the 2022 Lifeboat Foundation Guardian Award.

== Early life ==
Glenn graduated from American University with a BA in Philosophy (1968) and Antioch University New England with an MA in Teaching Social Science where he created Futuristic Curriculum (1971). In 1972 Glenn invented the Futures wheel, a new method of brainstorming about the future, and in 1973 he coined the term "futuring." He served as a Peace Corps Volunteer from 1968 to 1970, where he focused on how tropical medicine and management could be used to combat leprosy; combined with his work on future-oriented education and participatory decision-making systems, his efforts led Saturday Review to label Glenn as one of America's "most unusually gifted leaders" in a 1974 article.

== Career ==
Jerome "Jerry" Glenn was the SYNCON coordinator for The Committee for the Future (1973-1975) and a founding partner of Future Options Room (FOR) in 1975 with Roy Mason and Scott Dankman Joy. FOR was one of the first futures consulting firms and had Alvin Toffler, Herman Kahn, Ted Gordon, and other leading futurists on its board. Glenn helped to craft the section of the SALT II treaty (1979) that prohibited the USSR from deploying its Fractional Orbital Bombardment System. In 1983 he created CARINET, a computer network that CGNET Services International later acquired, and through CARINET he introduced data packet switching to numerous countries in the developing world. In 1996 Glenn and Theodore J. Gordon wrote a report in cooperation with the Smithsonian Institution and the Futures Group (rebranded as Palladium International) about the feasibility of establishing a futures think tank; later that year he co-founded the Millennium Project, an organization that evaluates 15 global challenges to the future of humanity. He authors an annual publication, State of the Future, on behalf of the Millennium Project, and in the book he uses a compilation of various methodologies in order to ensure effective forecasting. As Director of the Millennium Project he consults governments, organizations, and corporations about his forecasting methodology and on other issues, such as defense and technology. His work has been cited over 3,300 times according to Google Scholar.

== Views ==
Glenn believes nations should seek synergetic relations with others in addition to the traditional focus on competitive advantage. He also believes that horizontal organizational structures can sometimes be more effective than vertical ones. He declared, "The future of management is not based on a hierarchical structure, but on connecting different lines of action through nodes." According to Glenn, such human cooperation is necessary in order to create collective intelligence. Consequently, he has praised Wikipedia as a model for how to use international cooperation as a way to foster collective intelligence, while also criticizing prediction markets for not meeting the standard for collective intelligence due to their lack of feedback loops.

Glenn also argues that the 15 global challenges that he identifies are all interrelated. From his perspective, improvements in one area (such as access to clean water) will lead to advances in others (such as the rich-poor gap). Hence, Glenn believes that these issues need to be solved simultaneously. He has stated his preferred future is a Conscious-Technology Civilization with a Self-Actualization Economy. Glenn has also commented on the future of Africa, stating: "Many tribal power zero-sum games will continue, but eventually, the African Union will become more effective and help the more peaceful development of the continent."

== Published works ==
- African Futures Scenarios 2025, and UNDP workshop at the UN (1994)
- Millennium Project Feasibility Study final report (1995)
- Global Issues/Strategies four-round Global Lookout (Delphi) study (1996)
- Lessons of History (1997)
- Global Opportunities and Strategies Delphi (1997)
- Definitions of Environmental Security (1997)
- Futures Research in Decisionmaking (and checklist) (1998-99)
- Exploratory Scenarios (1998)
- Global Normative 2050 Scenario (1998)
- Environmental Security Threats and Policy Leadership (1998)
- Factors Required for Successful Implementation of Futures Research in Decision Making (1999)
- Current/Potential UN military doctrine on Environmental Security (1999)
- Six Alternative Year 3000 Scenarios (1999)
- S&T Issues over the next 25 years (2000)
- Future Technological Implications for Society and the UN System (2000)
- World Leaders on Global Challenges; UN Summit (2001)
- Environmental Crimes in Military Actions and the International Criminal Court (ICC)––UN Perspectives (2001)
- Management Implications of Future S&T 2025 Issues (2001)
- New Military Environmental Security Requirements 2010-2015 (2001)
- Conunterterrorism Scenarios; Scenarios, Actions, and Policies (2001-2002)
- Global Goals for the year 2050 (2002)
- Future S&T Scenarios 2025 (2002)
- Emerging Environmental Security Issues for Future UN Treaties (2002)
- Monthly Reports: Emerging Environmental Security Issues (2002-2011)
- Middle East Peace Scenarios (2002-04)
- Early Warning System for Kuwait Oil Company (2003-04)
- Nanotech Military R&D Health/Env Research Prevention Priorities 2004-05)
- Future Global Ethical Issues (2004-05)
- Global Energy Scenarios (2006-07)
- South Korea SOFI (2006)
- Future of Learning and Education 2030 (2007)
- Global Climate Change Situation Room for Gimcheon, South Korea (2007-2008)
- Conceptual design for global energy collective intelligence (GENIS) (2008)
- Status of Government Future Strategy Units (2008)
- RTDelphi for UNESCO World Water Report (2008)
- WFUNA Human Rights (2008)
- Decision Criteria Evaluation of Global Environment Facility (2008)
- South Korea SOFI and South African SOFI (2008)
- Early Warning System PMO Kuwait (2008-2009)
- Potential Future Elements of the Next Economic System (2009)
- UNESCO World Water Scenarios project (2009)
- Future of Ontologists (2009)
- Future Hopes and Fears: a Kuwait Perspective (2010-2011)
- Latin America 2030 Scenarios (2009-2011)
- Egypt 2020 (2010)
- Changes to Gender Stereotypes (2011)
- Azerbaijan SOFI (2011)
- Future Arts, Media, and Entertainment: Seeds for 2020 (2011)
- Cooperatives 2030: Factors Impacting Future of Cooperatives and Business (2012)
- Egypt’s national Synergetic Information System (ECISIS) (2013-16)
- Hidden Hunger: Unhealthy Food Markets in the Developing World (2013)
- Vulnerable Natural Infrastructure in Urban Coastal Zones (2013)
- FUTURES Dictionary/Encyclopedia (English and Spanish) (2014)
- SIMAD and Lone Wolf Terrorism Counter Strategies (2014)
- Czech Rep., Hungary, Poland, Slovakia, Visegrad Region SOFIs (2014-2015)
- Water-Energy-Food Nexus in the Context of Climate Change (2015-16)
- Pre-Detection of Terrorism Strategies RTDelphi, NATO Workshop (2015-17)
- Future Work/Tech Real-Time Delphi Studies (9 RTDs 2015-2017)
- National Strategy Workshops (30) on the Future of Work/Technology (2017-2019)
- Work/Technology 2050 : Scenarios and Actions report (2020)
- COVID-19 Three USA Scenarios (using 5 RT Delphi studies for input) (2020)
- Future developments and new industries EY (2021)
- Robots 2050 (2022)
- Future of Life Institute competition Artificial General Intelligence 2045 (2022)
- Five UN Foresight Elements of Our Common Agenda; Results of a Real-Time Delphi Study (2022)
- AGI Governance Issues: 55 AGI experts views on 22 questions (2023)
- AGI Regulations and Governance models: RT Delphi of 299 from 60 countries (2024)
- Global Governance of the Transition to Artificial General Intelligence: Issues and Requirements (2025)
- Future AI – AGI: Issues, Governance, and Scenarios (2026)
