= Cosmopolitanism =

Idea that all humans are part of one community

Cosmopolitanism is the idea that all human beings are members of a single community. Its adherents are known as cosmopolitan or cosmopolite. Cosmopolitanism is both prescriptive and aspirational, believing humans can and should be "world citizens" in a "universal community". The idea encompasses different dimensions and avenues of community, such as promoting universal moral standards, establishing global political structures, or developing a platform for mutual cultural expression and tolerance.

For example, Kwame Anthony Appiah articulates a cosmopolitan community where individuals from varying locations (physical, economic, etc.) enter relationships of mutual respect despite their differing beliefs (religious, political, etc.). In a looser but related sense, "cosmopolitan" is also used to describe places where people of various ethnic, cultural and/or religious backgrounds live together and interact with each other.

== Etymology ==
The word derives from the Ancient Greek: κοσμοπολίτης, or kosmopolitês, formed from "κόσμος", kosmos, i.e. "world", "universe", or "cosmos", and πολίτης, "politês", i.e. "citizen" or "[one] of a city". Contemporary usage defines the term as "citizen of the world".

== Definitions ==
Definitions of cosmopolitanism usually begin with the Greek etymology of "citizen of the world". However, as Appiah points out, "world" in the original sense meant "cosmos" or "universe", not earth or globe as current use assumes.

Kleingeld and Brown distinguish between moral, political, cultural and economic forms of cosmopolitanism. In the United States, two forms of cosmopolitanism have been established. For one, there is a political cosmopolitan nationalism that has defined and constructed other races. On the other hand, ethno-cultural cosmopolitanism that celebrates multiculturalism has benefited from an upswing in the United States after World War II. A definition of cosmopolitanism that handles this issue is given in a recent (2014) book on political globalization:

Cosmopolitanism can be defined as a global politics that, firstly, projects a sociality of common political engagement among all human beings across the globe, and, secondly, suggests that this sociality should be either ethically or organizationally privileged over other forms of sociality.

== Philosophical ==
=== Philosophical roots ===
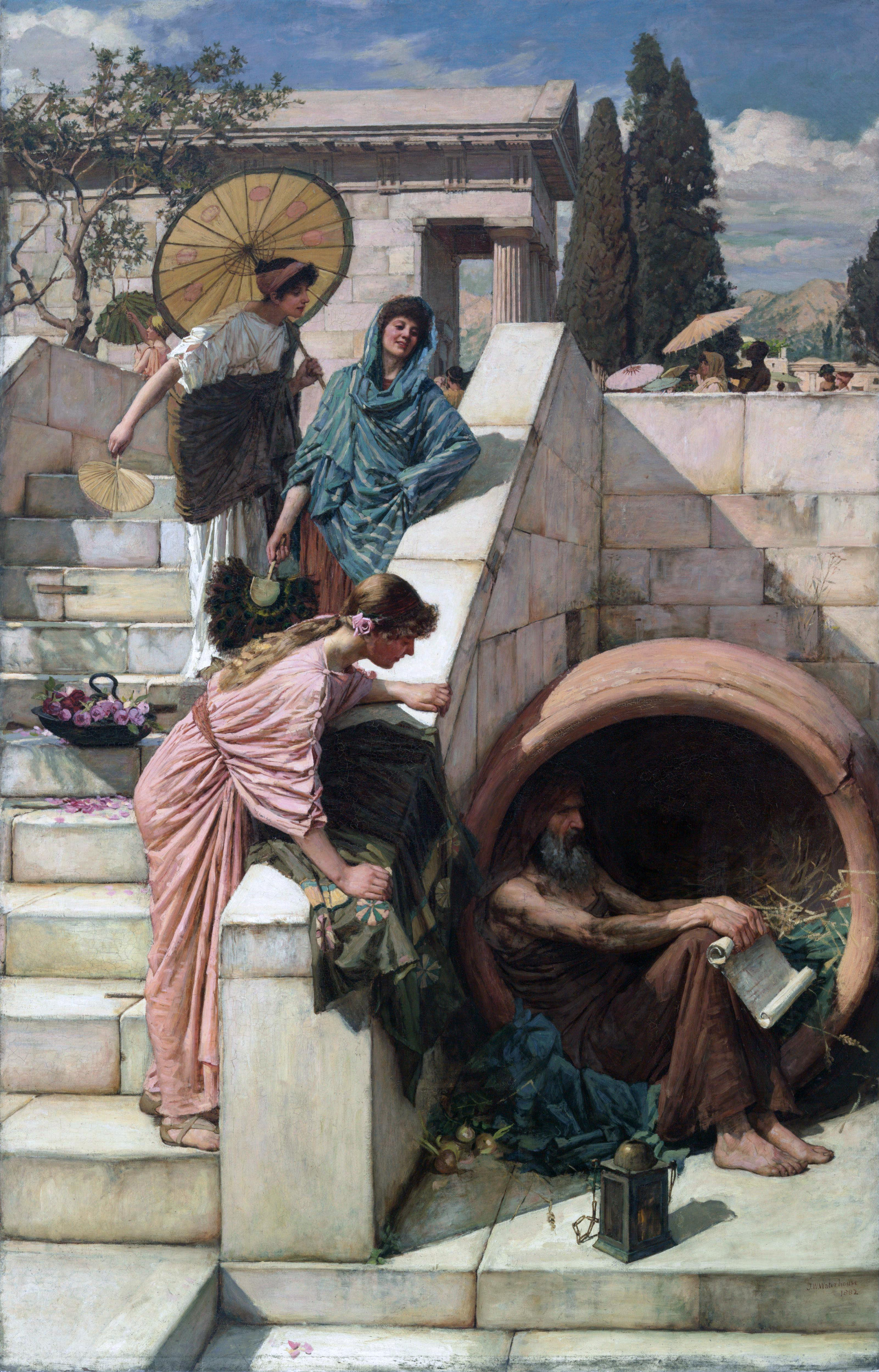
Diogenes by John William Waterhouse, 1882

Cosmopolitanism can be traced back to Diogenes of Sinope (c. 412 B.C.E), one of the founders of Cynicism in Ancient Greece. It was said that when Diogenes was "Asked where he came from, he answered: 'I am a citizen of the world (kosmopolitês)'". At the time, the broadest basis of social identity among Greeks was either the individual city-state or the culturally and linguistically homogeneous Hellenic group.

Stoicism, another Greek school of thought that was founded roughly a century later, built upon Diogenes' idea, with many of its thinkers and adherents stressing that each human being "dwells [...] in two communities – the local community of our birth, and the community of human argument and aspiration". A common way to understand Stoic cosmopolitanism is through Hierocles' circle model of identity, which states that individuals should regard themselves as concentric circles: the first one around the self, followed by immediate family, extended family, local group, citizens, countrymen, humanity. Within these circles human beings feel a sense of "affinity" or "endearment" towards others, which the Stoics termed Oikeiôsis. The task of world citizens becomes then to "draw the circles somehow towards the centre, making all human beings more like our fellow city dwellers, and so forth".

The ancient Chinese philosopher Mozi in preserved scripts said that "universal love and mutual benefit" could be attained "to regard other people's countries as one's own". The Chinese term tianxia (all under Heaven), a metonym for empire, has also been re-interpreted in the modern age as a conception of cosmopolitanism, and was used by 1930s modernists as the title of a Shanghai-based, English-language journal of world arts and letters T'ien Hsia Monthly.

=== Modern cosmopolitan thinkers ===
In his 1795 essay "Perpetual Peace: A Philosophical Sketch", Immanuel Kant stages a ius cosmopoliticum (cosmopolitan law/right) as a guiding principle to help global society achieve permanent, enduring peace. Kant's cosmopolitan right (Weltbürgerrecht, or "world-citizen right") stems from an understanding of all human beings as equal members of a universal community. Cosmopolitan right thus works in tandem with international political rights, and the shared, universal right of humanity.

Kant's cosmopolitan right is fundamentally bound to the conditions of universal hospitality and the right of resort. Universal hospitality is defined as the right to be welcomed upon arrival in foreign territory, but is contingent on a guest arriving in a peaceful manner. Kant makes the additional claim that all human beings have the basic right of resort: the right to present oneself in a foreign land. The right of resort is derived from Kant's understanding of the Earth's surface as essentially communal, and further emphasizing his claims on equally shared universal rights among all human beings.

The philosophical concepts of Emmanuel Levinas, on ethics, and Jacques Derrida, on hospitality, provide a theoretical framework for the relationships between people in their everyday lives and apart from any form of written laws or codes. For Levinas, the foundation of ethics consists in the obligation to respond to the Other. In Being for the Other, he writes that there is no "universal moral law," only the sense of responsibility (goodness, mercy, charity) that the Other, in a state of vulnerability, calls forth. The proximity of the Other is an important part of Levinas's concept: the face of the Other is what compels the response.

For Derrida, the foundation of ethics is hospitality, the readiness and the inclination to welcome the Other into one's home. Ethics, he claims, is hospitality. Pure, unconditional hospitality is a desire that underscores the conditional hospitality necessary in our relationships with others. Levinas's and Derrida's theories of ethics and hospitality hold out the possibility of an acceptance of the Other as different but of equal standing. Isolation is not a feasible alternative in the world, therefore, it is important to consider how best to approach these interactions, and to determine what is at stake for ourselves and the others: what conditions of hospitality to impose, and whether or not we have responded to the call of the Other. Further, both theories reveal the importance of considering how best to interact with the Other and others, and what is at stake.

Derrida in an interview with Bennington (1997) summarized "cosmopolitanism",

There is a tradition of cosmopolitanism, and if we had time we could study this tradition, which comes to us from, on the one hand, Greek thought with the Stoics, who have a concept of the 'citizen of the world'. You also have St. Paul in the Christian tradition, also a certain call for a citizen of the world as, precisely, a brother. St. Paul says that we are all brothers, that is sons of God, so we are not foreigners, we belong to the world as citizens of the world; and it is this tradition that we could follow up until Kant for instance, in whose concept of cosmopolitanism we find the conditions for hospitality. But in the concept of the cosmopolitical in Kant there are a number of conditions: first of all you should, of course, welcome the stranger, the foreigner, to the extent that he is a citizen of another country, that you grant him the right to visit and not to stay, and there are a number of other conditions that I can't summarise here quickly, but this concept of the cosmopolitical which is very novel, very worthy of respect (and I think cosmopolitanism is a very good thing), is a very limited concept. (Derrida cited in Bennington 1997).

— Bennington. Politics and Friendship: A Discussion with Jacques Derrida. 1997.

A further state of cosmopolitanism occurred after the Second World War. As a reaction to the Holocaust and other atrocities, the concept of crimes against humanity became a generally accepted category in international law. This clearly shows the appearance and acceptance of a notion of individual responsibility that is considered to exist toward all of humankind.

Philosophical cosmopolitans are moral universalists: they believe that all humans, and not merely compatriots or fellow-citizens, come under the same moral standards. The boundaries between nations, states, cultures or societies are therefore morally irrelevant. A widely cited example of a contemporary cosmopolitan is Kwame Anthony Appiah.

Some philosophers and scholars argue that the objective and subjective conditions arising in today's unique historical moment, an emerging planetary phase of civilization, creates a latent potential for the emergence of a cosmopolitan identity as global citizens and possible formation of a global citizens movement. These emerging objective and subjective conditions in the planetary phase include improved and affordable telecommunications; space travel and the first images of our fragile planet floating in the vastness of space; the emergence of global warming and other ecological threats to our collective existence; new global institutions such as the United Nations, World Trade Organization, or International Criminal Court; the rise of transnational corporations and integration of markets often termed economic globalization; the emergence of global NGOs and transnational social movements, such as the World Social Forum; and so on. Globalization, a more common term, typically refers more narrowly to the economic and trade relations and misses the broader cultural, social, political, environmental, demographic, values and knowledge transitions taking place.

=== Contemporary cosmopolitan thinkers ===
Thich Nhat Hanh discusses what he calls "Interbeing" as a way of living one's life in relation to others; "Interbeing" might easily be compared to cosmopolitanism. Nhat Hanh's philosophical beliefs are grounded in the precepts of Buddhist teachings, which involve compassion and understanding to protect and live in harmony with all people, animals, plants, and minerals. He further describes what he calls "Mindfulness Training of the Order of Interbeing" as being aware of sufferings created by, but not limited to, the following causes: fanaticism and intolerances that disrupt compassion and living in harmony with others; indoctrination of narrow-minded beliefs; imposition of views; anger; and miscommunication. Understanding and compassion for others seems to be achieved by the understanding of others' suffering and the root causes of suffering. Therefore, to be responsible is to recognize and understand suffering, which then leads to compassion. It is through this process that others can be recognized as people.

Other theorists, philosophers, and activists contend that recognizing suffering is necessary to end violence. In Scared Sacred, Velcrow Ripper takes a journey to different sites of great suffering that ultimately leads him toward developing compassion. In "The Planet", Paul Gilroy explores how the construction and naturalization of race and the hierarchies produced by difference shape the hatred of others. It is the deconstruction of these ideologies that can lead to the compassion and humanization of others. Thus individual responsibility is being aware of what Judith Butler calls the precariousness of life in self and other; being a cosmopolitan seems to be, above all, a social, ethical enterprise.

In Cosmopolitanism: Ethics in a World of Strangers, Kwame Anthony Appiah notes how social ethics seem to operate: Whatever obligation one might have to another, especially a foreign other, that obligation does not supersede the obligations one has to those people most familiar to them. However, as Judith Butler questions, "at what cost do I establish the familiar as the criterion" for valuing others? If one values the familiar more than the foreign, what are the consequences? Paul Gilroy offers a possible alternative to this emphasis on familiarity arguing that "methodical cultivation of a degree of estrangement from one's own culture and history ... might qualify as essential to a cosmopolitan commitment." This estrangement entails a "process of exposure to otherness" in order to foster "the irreducible value of diversity within sameness."

For Gilroy, being cosmopolitan seems to involve both a social, ethical enterprise and a cultural enterprise. In "The Planet", Gilroy describes the cases of Tom Hurndall and Rachel Corrie; each seems to exemplify what might be considered Gilroy's figure of the cosmopolitan. Both Hurndall and Corrie removed themselves (geographically) from their home cultures, presumably both physically and mentally estranging themselves from their own cultures and histories. Hurndall and Corrie were both killed in 2003 (in separate incidents). Gilroy's model of estrangement might actually undermine itself through its examples; this might be construed as a failure of Gilroy's theory to address the practical difficulties of estranging oneself from the familiar.

The Venus Project, an international, multidisciplinary educational organization created by Jacque Fresco, works to spread cosmopolitan ideas by transcending artificial boundaries currently separating people and emphasizing an understanding of our interdependence with nature and each other.

Some forms of cosmopolitanism also fail to address the potential for economic colonization by powerful countries over less powerful ones. Frantz Fanon, in The Wretched of the Earth, observes that when nations achieved independence from European colonizers, frequently there was no system in place to secure their economic future, and they became "manager[s] for Western enterprise...in practise set[ting] up its country as the brothel of Europe." When "third world" nations are drawn into economic partnerships with global capital, ostensibly to improve their national quality of life, often the only ones benefitting from this partnership are well-placed individuals and not the nation itself. Others highlighted the importance of moving beyond Western liberal values. Drawing on classical realism, they consider liberalism insufficient to promote equality between nations, breaking the iron laws of competition between states; instead, they look at Byzantine and other pre-modern cultures. Likewise, Mahmood Mamdani in Good Muslim, Bad Muslim suggests that the imposition of Western cultural norms, democracy and Christianity to name only two, has historically resulted in nationalist violence; however, Appiah has implied that democracy is a pre-requisite for cosmopolitan intervention in developing nations.

Much of the political thinking of the last two centuries has taken nationalism and the framework of the sovereign nation-state for granted. With the advance of globalization and the increased facility of travel and communication, some thinkers consider that the political system based on the nation-state has become obsolete and that it is time to design a better and more efficient alternative. Jesús Mosterín analyzes how the world political system should be organized in order to maximize individual freedom and individual opportunity. Rejecting as muddled the metaphysical notion of free will, he focuses on political freedom, the absence of coercion or interference by others in personal decisions. Because of the tendencies to violence and aggression that lurk in human nature, some constraint on freedom is necessary for peaceful and fruitful social interaction.

Especially, there is no rational ground for curtailing the cultural freedoms (of language, religion and customs) in the name of the nation, the church, or the party. From this point of view, the Internet provides a much more attractive model than the nation-state. Neither is there any just reason for restraining the free circulation of people, ideas, or goods. Mosterín thinks that the nation-state is incompatible with the full development of freedom, whose blossoming requires the reorganization of the world political system along cosmopolitan lines. He proposes a world without sovereign nation-states, territorially organized in small autonomous but not-sovereign cantonal polities, complemented by strong world organizations.

Criticizing the abstract nature of most versions of cosmopolitanism, Charles Blattberg has argued that any viable cosmopolitanism must be "rooted," by which he means based upon a "global patriotism."

More general philosophical reviews of cosmopolitanism and multiculturalism are also available. Carol Nicholson compares John Searle's opposition to multiculturalism with Charles Taylor's celebration of it. She uses Richard Rorty as a triangulation point in that he remains neutral about multiculturalism, but his philosophical analysis of truth and practice can be deployed to argue against Searle and in favor of Taylor. At a conference on "Philosophy in a Multicultural Context", Rasmus Winther excavated the philosophical assumptions and practices connected with cosmopolitanism and multiculturalism. He develops Bruno Latour's conception of the philosopher as public diplomat.

== Political and sociological ==
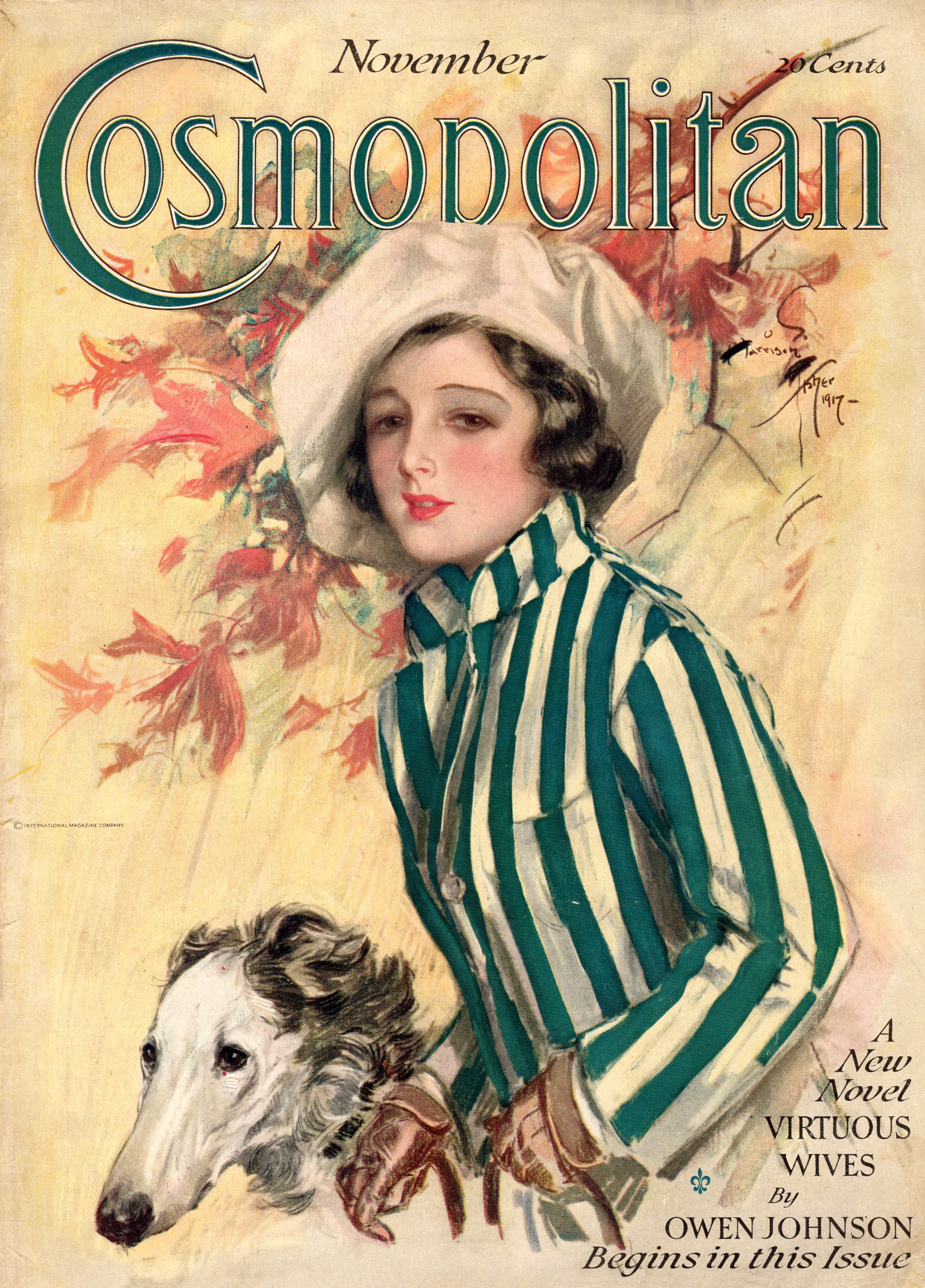
November 1917 issue of Cosmopolitan cover by Harrison Fisher

Emile Durkheim (1858–1917) observed the development of what he called the 'cult of the individual', which is a new religion that replaced the Christianity that was dying out, and which is centered around the sacredness of human dignity. This new religion would provide the new foundations of Western society, and these foundations are closely related to human rights and individual nation's constitutions. A society's sacred object would be the individual's human dignity, and the moral code guiding the society is found in that country's way of interpreting human dignity and human rights. Thus, rather than finding solidarity through national culture, or a particular traditional religious doctrine, society would be unified by its adherence to political values, i.e. individual rights and a defence of human dignity. Durkheim's cult of the individual has many similarities to John Rawls' political liberalism, which Rawls developed almost a century after Durkheim.

In his posthumously published (1957) "Professional Ethics and Civic Morals" Durkheim wrote that:

If each State had as its chief aim not to expand or to lengthen its borders, but to set its own house in order and to make the widest appeal to its members for a moral life on an ever-higher level, then all discrepancy between national and human morals would be excluded. … The more societies concentrate their energies inwards, on the interior life, the more they will be diverted from the disputes that bring a clash between cosmopolitanism – or world patriotism, and patriotism … Societies can have their pride, not in being the greatest or the wealthiest, but in being the most just, the best organised and in possessing the best moral constitution.

Ulrich Beck (May 15, 1944 – January 1, 2015) was a sociologist who posed the new concept of cosmopolitan critical theory in direct opposition to traditional nation-state politics. Nation-state theory sees power relations only among different state actors, and excludes a global economy, or subjugates it to the nation-state model. Cosmopolitanism sees global capital as a possible threat to the nation state and places it within a meta-power game in which global capital, states and civil society are its players.

It is important to mark a distinction between Beck's cosmopolitanism and the idea of a world state. For Beck, imposing a single world order was considered hegemonic at best and ethnocentric at worst. Rather, political and sociological cosmopolitanism rests upon these fundamental foundations:

- "Acknowledging the otherness of those who are culturally different"
- "Acknowledging the otherness of the future"
- "Acknowledging the otherness of nature"
- "Acknowledging the otherness of the object"
- "Acknowledging the otherness of other rationalities"

A number of philosophers, including Emmanuel Levinas, have introduced the concept of the "Other". For Levinas, the Other is given context in ethics and responsibility; we should think of the Other as anyone and everyone outside ourselves. According to Levinas, our initial interactions with the Other occur before we form a will—the ability to make choices. The Other addresses us and we respond: even the absence of response is a response. We are thus conditioned by the Other's address and begin to form culture and identity. After the formation of the will, we choose whether to identify with the addresses by others and, as a result, continue the process of forming identity.

During this process, it is possible to recognize ourselves in our interactions with Others. Even in situations where we engage in the most minimal interaction, we ascribe identities to others and simultaneously to ourselves. Our dependence on the Other for the continuous formation of language, culture, and identity means that we are responsible to others and that they are responsible to us. Also once we've formed a will, it becomes possible to recognize this social interdependence. When we have gained the capacity for recognition, the imperative is to perform that recognition and thereby become ethically responsible to the Other in conscience.

Cosmopolitanism shares some aspects of universalism – namely the globally acceptable notion of human dignity that must be protected and enshrined in international law. However, the theory deviates in recognising the differences between world cultures.

In addition, cosmopolitanism calls for equal protection of the environment and against the negative side effects of technological development. Human dignity, however, is convoluted because it is necessary to first distinguish who has the right to be respected and second to consider what rights are protectable. Under cosmopolitanism, all humans have rights; however, history shows that recognition of these rights is not guaranteed.

As an example, Judith Butler discusses a Western discourse of "human" in Precarious Life: The Powers of Mourning and Violence. Butler works through the idea of "human" and notes that "human" has been "naturalized in its 'Western' mold by the contemporary workings of humanism" (32). Thus, there is the idea that not all "human" lives will be supported in the same way, indeed, that some human lives are worth more protection than others. Others have extended this idea to examine how animals might be reconfigured as cosmopolitan, present the world-over with varying identities in different places.

This idea is reiterated in Sunera Thobani's "Exalted Subjects: Studies in the Making of Race and Nation in Canada," where she discusses a discourse in which Muslim people fall into a good/bad dichotomy: a "good Muslim" is one who has been Westernized and a "bad Muslim" is one who visibly rejects Western cultural influences. Thobani notes that it is through media representations that these ideas become naturalized. Individuals who embrace Western ideals are considered fully "human" and are more likely to be afforded dignity and protection than those who defend their non-Westernized cultural identities.

According to those who follow Beck's reasoning, a cosmopolitan world would consist of a plurality of states, which would use global and regional consensus to gain greater bargaining power against opponents. States would also utilize the power of civil society actors such as Non-governmental organizations (NGOs) and consumers to strengthen their legitimacy and enlist the help of investors to pursue a cosmopolitan agenda.

Other authors imagine a cosmopolitan world moving beyond today's conception of nation-states. These scholars argue that a truly cosmopolitan identity within global citizenship will take hold, diminishing the importance of national identities. The formation of a global citizens movement would lead to the establishment of democratic global institutions, creating the space for global political discourse and decisions, would in turn reinforce the notion of citizenship at a global level. Nested structures of governance balancing the principles of irreducibility (i.e., the notion that certain problems can only be addressed at the global level, such as global warming) and subsidiarity (i.e., the notion that decisions should be made at as local a level possible) would thus form the basis for a cosmopolitan political order.

Daniele Archibugi proposes a renewed model for global citizenship: institutional cosmopolitanism. It advocates some reforms in global governance to allow world citizens to take more directly a part into political life. A number of proposals have been made in order to make this possible. Cosmopolitan democracy, for example, suggests strengthening the United Nations and other international organizations by creating a World Parliamentary Assembly.

== Non-Western Perspectives ==
=== Vazha-Pshavela ===
In his 1905 essay «კოსმოპოლიტიზმი და პატრიოტიზმი» (Kosmopolitizmi da Patriotizmi; "Cosmopolitanism and Patriotism"), first published in the literary periodical Droeba in Tbilisi, Georgian poet and public intellectual Vazha-Pshavela (Luka Razikashvili; 1861–1915) sought to reconcile national identity with universal human solidarity. He distinguished between emotional attachment to one's homeland and rational commitment to humanity at large, arguing that the two are complementary rather than mutually exclusive.

He wrote that "cosmopolitanism is a matter of the brain, patriotism is a matter of the heart," and insisted that "your neighbor's misery is your own," asserting that true patriotism must extend concern to all people. He criticized those who renounce their national roots under the guise of universalism: "He who negates his country while calling himself cosmopolitan is maimed by illusions." Moreover, he argued that a nation's cosmopolitan credentials are judged by its treatment of internal minorities, warning that "the man who scorns the stranger among his own people wears blinders against humanity."

Turning to practical considerations, Vazha-Pshavela maintained that inventions and discoveries originating in one country "benefit all humanity" and that "an invention confined to its birthplace is an invention half-born," thereby advocating the free circulation of technological and cultural advances across borders. He further celebrated cultural exchange, noting that no literary or artistic genius can flourish in isolation and that foreign influences "blossom new flowers in our own garden," enriching national traditions rather than diluting them.

He further concluded that "the separate development of nations is the condition for the development of all humanity," emphasizing cultural diversity as a prerequisite for universal progress. His essay responded in part to intellectual currents in the late Russian Empire and among Georgian Marxists, who often prioritized international class solidarity over national particularism. Modern scholars interpret his work as an early articulation of rooted cosmopolitanism, an approach affirming global ethical responsibility while preserving local identity.

== Criticism ==
"Cosmopolitanism" became a rhetorical weapon used by nationalists against "alien" ideas that went counter to orthodoxy. European Jews were frequently accused of being "rootless cosmopolitans." Joseph Stalin in a 1946 Moscow speech attacked writings in which "the positive Soviet hero is derided and inferior before all things foreign and cosmopolitanism that we all fought against from the time of Lenin, characteristic of the political leftovers, is many times applauded."

In the German Democratic Republic, cosmopolitanism was characterized as a bourgeois-imperialist ideology that rejects the nations' right to independence and national sovereignty. Cosmopolitanism was said to promote the dismantling of national and patriotic traditions and national culture. It was said to be advocated by the Anglo-American imperialism with an aim to establish world hegemony (World Government) operating in the interests of monopoly capitalism. Its opposite was not chauvinist bourgeois nationalism, but patriotism; love of one's native place, one's country. Love of the homeland was said to be one of the deepest feelings of the working people, expressed in the struggle against conquerors and oppressors. Television journalist Jeff Greenfield believes that in the 21st century cosmopolitanism was viewed by Vladimir Putin as a threat to Russian nationalism, and also by nationalists in Hungary and Poland. In modern times, Stephen Miller, a Trump administration senior policy advisor, publicly criticized CNN reporter Jim Acosta as exhibiting "cosmopolitan bias" during a discussion on the government's new immigration plan.

Critiques of cosmopolitanism emphasize that modern cosmopolitan projects consistently fail not because of international anarchy or insufficient moral aspiration, but because their transformative ambitions destabilise existing social and political orders, provoking intense contestation over hierarchy and recognition. Efforts to universalise human belonging repeatedly generate “hierarchy legitimation conflicts” and “recognition struggles” that, especially in moments of instability, reinvigorate state authority and exclusionary national identities rather than transcend them. Modern power structures, entrenched forms of political belonging and the steep institutional and social conditions required to legitimate new global authorities render cosmopolitan order theoretically imaginable yet practically unattainable. Across Kantian, Marxian, postcolonial and ecological variants, cosmopolitan visions have triggered counter-mobilisations that reshape international society in unintended ways, revealing how universalist projects often collide with geopolitical rivalry, identity politics and uneven power relations. Taken together, these critiques portray cosmopolitanism as a recurring but fragile imaginary, rooted in genuine aspirations for justice, yet persistently undermined by the social forces and political realities of modern international social life.

Cosmopolitan localism (or cosmolocalism) has been advanced by scholars such as Wolfgang Sachs and later developed and popularised by Vasilis Kostakis and Michel Bauwens as an attempt to reconcile cosmopolitanism with place-based forms of production and governance, often summarized by the principle “design global, manufacture local.” However, it has also been interpreted as an implicit critique of classical cosmopolitanism’s universalist tendencies. In emphasizing locally grounded autonomy, commons-based peer production, and distributed networks, proponents argue that abstract globalism can obscure inequalities embedded in global techno-economic systems. Critics of cosmolocal approaches, in turn, contend that they may rely too heavily on technological solutions or remain insufficiently critical of existing global structures, while others argue that they reproduce simplified oppositions between local and global or between capitalism and its alternatives. Within debates on cosmopolitanism, cosmopolitan localism thus functions both as a reformulation and a critique, highlighting tensions between universal ethical commitments and the need for locally embedded, plural, and context-sensitive forms of social organization.

== See also ==
- Anarchism
- Anationalism
- Anti-patriotism
- Anti-fascism
- Anti-capitalism
- Bleeding-heart libertarianism
- Communism
- Cosmopolitan (disambiguation)
- Cross-culturalism
- Cultural universal
- Democratic globalization
- Europeanism
- Eurasianism
- Evolutionary ethics
- Existential migration
- Global citizenship
- Global justice
- Human rights
- Humanism
- Interculturalism
- Internationalism (politics)
- Left-wing politics
- Liberalism
- Libertarianism
- Managerial state
- Multiculturalism
- New world order (Baháʼí)
- Oneness of humanity (Baháʼí)
- Open society
- Parochialism
- Patriotism
- Rootless cosmopolitan
- Separatism
- Socialism
- Transculturation
- Ubi panis ibi patria
- United Nations Parliamentary Assembly
- Universal brotherhood
- Vasudhaiva Kutumbakam
- World Federalism
