= Tariq Banuri =

- Education: Economics
- Alma mater: Harvard University; University of Peshawar; Williams College

Tariq Banuri is an economist and scholar who served as the fourth chairperson of Pakistan's Higher Education Commission. He is an associate fellow at the Tellus Institute, where he co-developed and coordinated the Great Transition Initiative. His work has focused on climate change and sustainable development. He is also the founding executive director of the Sustainable Development Policy Institute in Islamabad, Pakistan. He previously served as director of the United Nations Division for Sustainable Development, and as chair of the steering committee for the International Union for Conservation of Nature (IUCN)'s Commission on Environmental, Economic and Social Policy (CEESP).

== Background ==
Banuri graduated with a bachelor's degree in civil engineering from the University of Peshawar, and holds a master's degree in development economics from Williams College. He completed his PhD in economics at Harvard University. He subsequently worked as a professor of economics at the University of Utah.

In May 2018, Banuri was announced as the fourth chairperson of the Higher Education Commission. He served in this role until May 2022.
