= Global citizens movement =

Movement for global cooperation

The global citizens movement is a constellation of organized and overlapping citizens' groups seeking to foster global solidarity in policy and consciousness. The term is often used synonymously with the anti-globalization movement or the global justice movement.

== Background ==
The concept of global citizenship first emerged in the 4th Century BCE among the Greek Cynics, who coined the term “cosmopolitan” – meaning citizen of the world. The Stoics later elaborated on the concept, and contemporary philosophers and political theorists have further developed it in the concept of cosmopolitanism, which proposes that all individuals belong to a single moral community.

The twenty-first century has seen increasing calls for global citizenship in light of how transportation and technology—are binding disparate parts of the world more closely together than ever before. Authors as Paul Raskin, Paul H. Ray, David Korten, and Gus Speth have argued for the existence of a latent pool of tens of millions of people ready to identify with a global consciousness, such as that captured in the Earth Charter. Organizations such as Oxfam International believe that a global citizens movement rooted in social and economic justice is emerging and is necessary for ending global poverty. The Global Scenario Group likewise identified such a movement as the key change agent in a Great Transition to a socially and ecologically sustainable future. A more recently formed group vying for a sustainable global future through international unification via an international federation are the Young World Federalists.

A global citizens movement would differ from the existing fragmented civil society organizations and social movements in that such campaigns and movements tend to be issue-specific rather than united in a shared struggle for a socially just and ecologically sustainable global society and the establishment of an institutional structure to support it.

== Critiques ==
Skeptics of the notion of a global citizens movement question whether or not a high enough level of global solidarity can emerge in light of nationalism, racism, and the dominance of the Westphalian state system. However, other scholars point out that the historical emergence of nationalism must have felt just as improbable in a time of warring city-states, and yet in retrospect appears inevitable.

In their book Multitude, Michael Hardt and Antonio Negri offer a more radical critique that posits Michel Foucault's notion of a “plurality of resistance” as the only legitimate path forward. Instead of leadership and organizational structures, Hardt and Negri put faith in the emergence of spontaneous coherence due to self-organized networks among various autonomous resistance movements. However, it remains unclear how a network of autonomous movements would differ in practice from a global citizens movement.

== See also ==
- Global citizenship
- Global justice
- Global justice movement
- Great Transition
- Social movement
- World community
- World government
- World Constitution and Parliament Association
