= Causal layered analysis =

Technique used in strategic planning and futurology

Causal layered analysis (CLA) is a future research theory that integrates various epistemic modes, creates spaces for alternative futures, and consists of four layers: litany, social/structural, worldview, and myth/metaphor. The method was created by Sohail Inayatullah, a Pakistani-Australian futures studies researcher.

== Summary ==
Causal layered analysis (CLA) is a theory and method that seeks to integrate empiricist, interpretive, critical, and action learning modes of research. In this method, forecasts, the meanings individuals give to these forecasts, the critical assumptions used, the narratives these are based on, and the actions and interventions that result are all valued and explored in CLA. This is true for both the external material world and the inner psychological world. As a method, its utility is not in predicting the future per se, as in creating transformative spaces for the analysis and the creation of alternative futures. It is also useful in developing more robust, efficient, and effective—deeper, inclusive, longer term—policy and strategy. A CLA framework facilitates a deep understanding the layers of complex and intersectional issues. The inner work leads not only to the reflective practitioner but ensures epistemological mindfulness. We enter the room aware that we are part of the problem or solution, that our stories can help or hurt. CLA of the self, for me, is a way to help others find ways out of current predicaments.

== Four layers ==
CLA comprises four layers:

1. Litany: the voice of the deeper layers of a particular group of people; the unquestioned, the most visible and obvious beliefs are put into words at this level.
2. Social and structural: the layer of rules, policies, and data analysis is usually articulated by policy institutes and dominates narratives of mass media and social media, often given credibility in not-quite academic journals or think tanks.
3. Worldview: the collective norms, standards and morals that individuals believe they should maintain, most often influenced by religious viewpoints, political allegiances, or professional practices. It is influenced by the myth/metaphor layer to create the collective vision of how they see the world and their place in it.
4. Myth/metaphor: the layer that explores the resilience and power of the distinguishing culture of a particular time or place that shapes the identity of a group of people through the historical retelling of archetypical beliefs.

== History of CLA ==
CLA was first introduced explicitly as a futures research technique by Sohail Inayatullah in a 1998 article for Futures that would come to be widely cited. Later, Inayatullah would edit the CLA Reader, CLA Reader 2.0 and CLA 3.0 that featured chapters from a number of futurists and practitioners describing their experience with CLA. The cognitive structure, which depicts the ideology of each layer of CLA, is based on the principals and theories of some thinkers such Michel Foucault, Johan Galtung, William Irwin Thompson, and P.R. Sarkar. CLA was examined in a book by Jose W. Ramos in 2003.

CLA was conceived in the early 1990s by Sohail Inayatullah, a political scientist and futurist. Inayatullah sought to create a method that went beyond traditional forecasting techniques, which often focused solely on surface-level trends and data. His aim was to delve deeper into the underlying causes and narratives that shape our understanding of the future. Since its development, CLA has been applied in various fields, including business strategy, public policy, and educational reform. It has been particularly influential in the Asia-Pacific region, with Inayatullah himself based in Australia and conducting numerous workshops and training sessions across the region. Sohail Inaytullah's work on CLA has led to numerous academic publications, and his approach has been recognized for its innovative contribution to the field and has been integrated into future studies courses and programs worldwide.

CLA continues to evolve, with Inayatullah and others in the field expanding its application and refining its methodologies. It is increasingly being combined with other futures methodologies to address complex and multifaceted challenges.

== CLA Books ==
- The Causal Layered Analysis (CLA) Reader: Theory and Case Studies of an Integrative and Transformative Methodology (2004)
- CLA 2.0: Transformative Research in Theory and Practice (2014)
- CLA 3.0: Thirty Years of Transformative Research (2022)

== See also ==
- Futures techniques
- Backcasting
- Futures Studies
