= Paul Raskin =

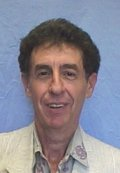
- Born: 1942 (age 83–84); Chicago
- Occupations: President of Tellus Institute, environmentalist
- Writing career
- Language: English
- Subjects: sustainability, scenario analysis
- Notable work: Great Transition

Paul Raskin is the founding president of the Tellus Institute, which has conducted over 3,500 research and policy projects throughout the world on environmental issues, resource planning, scenario analysis, and sustainable development. His research and writing has centered on propagating the Great Transition. Raskin has served as a lead author on a number of high-profile international reports, including the U.S. National Academy of Science's Board on Sustainability, the Millennium Ecosystem Assessment, the United Nations Environment Programme's Global Environment Outlook, the Earth Charter, and the Intergovernmental Panel on Climate Change (IPCC) Third Assessment Report.

== Background ==
Born in Chicago in 1942, Raskin was raised in California, receiving a B.A. in physics and philosophy in 1964 from the University of California, Berkeley, where his senior thesis was supervised by philosopher of science Paul Feyerabend. He went on to earn a Ph.D. in theoretical physics from Columbia University in 1970, and taught at the university level, becoming Chair of an interdisciplinary department at the State University of New York at Albany in 1973. In 1976, he co-founded the Tellus Institute, a non-profit research ad policy organization, where he has directed an interdisciplinary team working on environmental, resource, and development issues throughout the world. Raskin also founded the U.S. center of the Stockholm Environment Institute in 1989, the Global Scenario Group (GSG) in 1995, and the Great Transition Initiative (GTI) in 2003.

== Research contributions ==
Dr. Raskin's research has evolved through several phases: energy and environmental planning, integrated freshwater assessment, climate change mitigation strategies, and sustainable development studies. He conceived, developed, and disseminated widely used planning models, including the Long-range Energy Alternatives Planning (LEAP) system in 1980 and the Water Evaluation And Planning (WEAP) system in 1990, both now maintained by the US Center of the Stockholm Environment Institute. More recently, he created PoleStar, a comprehensive framework for exploring alternative global, regional and national scenarios.

Since the Brundtland Commission's seminal Our Common Future in 1987, for which he was a contributing author, Raskin's work has centered on developing comprehensive long-range scenarios of socio-ecological systems at different spatial scales: river-basin, nation, region, and globe. Toward that end, he organized the GSG in 1995 as an interdisciplinary and international team to examine alternative global scenarios for the twenty-first century. The GSG's work culminated in the 2002 essay Great Transition: The Promise and Lure of the Times Ahead, of which Dr. Raskin was the lead author. This essay describes the historic roots of the contemporary global challenge and considers alternative pathways for world development, advancing a Great Transition path as the preferred route. Detailed simulation of contrasting scenarios integrates a large body of social, economic, and environmental data.

== Great Transition ==
The conceptual point of departure of the Great Transition essay is that humanity is in the midst of a profound transition: the Planetary Phase of Civilization. According to this perspective, some form of global society will consolidate in the coming decades, but its ultimate character remains fundamentally and inherently uncertain. The development of the global system can branch in different directions, depending on the ways ecological systems respond to anthropogenic stresses, such as climate change and how social institutions evolve and conflicts are resolved. Most fundamentally, the form of twenty-first-century society that emerges will depend on which human values become ascendant and the choices people make in the critical years ahead. The essay envisions three broad classes of twenty-first-century scenarios — Conventional Worlds, Barbarization, and Great Transitions — and considers a number of variations within each category.

This framework has been used in numerous global, regional and national scenario assessments, such as UNEP's Global Environment Outlook. A recent comprehensive review of over 450 global scenarios found the GSG's framework to be the most useful and archetypal, "a testament to the original concept of the GSG scenarios and their development and refinement over a 16 year period."

== Selected publications ==
- Journey to Earthland: The Great Transition to Planetary Civilization. Boston: Tellus Institute, 2016.
- Great Transition: The Promise and Lure of the Times Ahead. Boston: Stockholm Environment Institute, 2002.
- Contours of a Resilient Global Future. Sustainability 6 (2014): 123–135.
- The Century Ahead: Searching for Sustainability. Sustainability 2, no. 8 (2010): 2626–2651.
- World Lines: A Framework for Exploring Global Pathways. Ecological Economics 65, no. 3 (2008): 461–470.
- Scenes from the Great Transition. Solutions 3, no. 4 (2012): 11–17. (Accessed 6 June 2013).
- Global Scenarios: Background Review for the Millennium Ecosystem Assessment. Ecosystems 8 (2005): 133–142.
- Imagine All the People: Advancing a Global Citizens Movement. Development 54 (2011): 287–290.
- The Problem of the Future: Sustainability Science and Scenario Analysis. Global Environmental Change 14 (2004): 137–146.
- Global Sustainability: Bending the Curve. London: Routledge Press, 2002.
- Halfway to the Future: A Reflection on the Global Condition. Boston: Tellus Institute, 2002.
- Our Common Journey: A Transition Toward Sustainability. Report of the Board on Sustainability of National Academy of Sciences. Washington, D.C.: National Academy Press, 1999.
- Bending the Curve: Toward Global Sustainability. Second Report of the Global Scenario Group. Stockholm: Stockholm Environment Institute, 1998 (Accessed 6 June 2013).
- Global Energy, Sustainability and the Conventional Development Paradigm. Energy Sources 20 (1998): 363–383.
- Water Futures: Assessment of long-range Patterns and Problems. Background Document of the Comprehensive Assessment of the Freshwater Resources of the World. Stockholm: Stockholm Environment Institute/United Nations, 1997.

== See also ==
- Great Transition
- Stockholm Environment Institute
- Tellus Institute
- Global Scenario Group
- Planetary Boundaries
- Scenario analysis
- Sustainable Development
