= Earl Bakken =

American engineer, inventor, and holistic healthcare promoter (1924–2018)

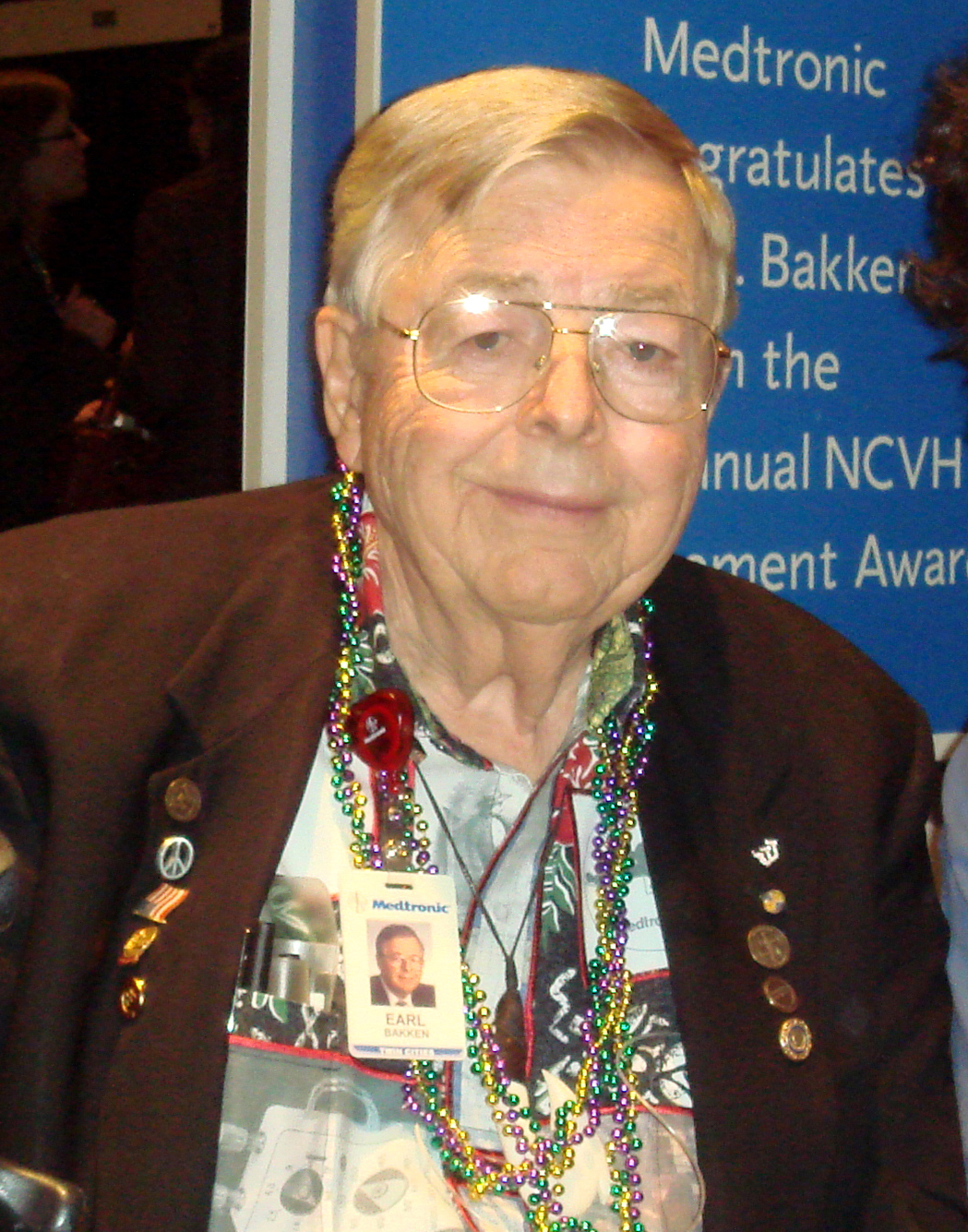
- Bakken in 2007
- Born: January 10, 1924; Columbia Heights, Minnesota, United States
- Died: October 21, 2018 (aged 94); Kona District, Hawaii, United States
- Education: BSEE and MSEE from the University of Minnesota
- Known for: founding Medtronic, inventing the wearable portable pacemaker, founding Bakken Museum

Earl Elmer Bakken (January 10, 1924 – October 21, 2018) was an American engineer, inventor, businessman and philanthropist. He founded Medtronic, where he developed the first external, battery-operated, transistorized, wearable artificial pacemaker in 1957.

== Early life and education ==
Bakken was born on January 10, 1924, in Columbia Heights, Minnesota and was of Norwegian ancestry. Bakken had a long-held fascination with electricity and electronics. A self-described "nerd", Bakken designed a rudimentary electroshock weapon in school to fend off bullies. He earned a Bachelor of Science degree in electrical engineering in 1948 from the University of Minnesota. His electrical engineering education continued, and he obtained a Master's degree with a minor in mathematics, also from the University of Minnesota.

As a boy, Bakken was inspired by the combination of electricity with medicine in Mary Shelley's novel Frankenstein, and the subsequent 1931 film version starring Boris Karloff was a direct inspiration for his future work, including his improvements to the pacemaker (the first to be battery-powered and wearable) and founding Medtronic. Bakken later founded a museum about medical science and electricity in Minneapolis, The Bakken, which features an extensive Frankenstein display.

== Career ==
Post-World War II hospitals were just starting to employ electronic equipment but did not have staff to maintain and repair them. Sensing an opportunity, with his brother-in-law, Palmer Hermundslie, he formed Medtronic (a portmanteau of "medical" and "electronic") in a small garage, primarily working with the University of Minnesota hospital.

In the 1950s, Dr. C. Walton Lillehei was performing life-saving surgery on children with blue baby syndrome. That surgery often left the children needing to be temporarily attached to a pacemaker. The pacemakers at the time were large devices that required their own carts and relied on wall current for power. As a result of a power blackout on October 31, 1957, one of Dr. Lillehei's young patients died. Dr. Lillehei, who had worked with Bakken before, asked him the next day if he could solve the problem. Four weeks after finding a circuit diagram for a metronome in Popular Electronics, Bakken delivered a battery-powered transistorized pacemaker about the size of a few decks of cards to Dr. Lillehei. After successfully testing the hand-made device in the laboratory, Bakken returned to create a refined model for patients. However, much to his astonishment, when he came in the next day, he found the pacemaker already in use on a patient. (The Food and Drug Administration did not start regulating medical devices until 1976.)

Over the next several years, Bakken and Medtronic worked with other doctors to develop fully implantable pacemakers, but they also veered toward bankruptcy. He borrowed money that kept Medtronic going, but the bankruptcy near-miss drove Bakken to develop the Medtronic Mission, which still guides the company. The mission helped the young company to stay focused on areas where it could truly help patients.

Bakken retired from Medtronic in 1989 and moved to a 9-acre estate in the Kona District of Hawaii he called Bakken Hale, but still returned to the company several times a year to meet new employees and explain the Medtronic Mission to them in person.

In 1996 he helped to dedicate the North Hawaii Community Hospital and was active there for some time afterward, working to combine Eastern and Western approaches to medicine to develop a more holistic approach to health care.

In 2001, Medtronic started the construction of its new European distribution center in Heerlen, The Netherlands. The street on which the facility was built is named after Bakken.

Bakken died at his Hawaii home on October 21, 2018, at the age of 94.

== Bibliography ==
- Borghi, Luca (2015). "Heart Matters. The Collaboration Between Surgeons and Engineers in the Rise of Cardiac Surgery". In Pisano, Raffaele (ed.). A Bridge between Conceptual Frameworks. History of Mechanism and Machine Science. Vol. 27. pp. 53–68. doi:10.1007/978-94-017-9645-3_4. ISBN 978-94-017-9644-6.
