= The Millennium Project =

Global futures research think tank

- Formation: 1996
- Type: Non-profit organization
- Legal status: 501(c)(3)
- Purpose: Global Futures Studies & Research
- Headquarters: Washington D.C.
- Region served: Worldwide
- Founder and Executive Director: Jerome C. Glenn
- Board of directors: Jerome Glenn, Acting Chairman, CEO, Co-Founder; Concepcion Olavarrieta, Vice-Chair; Elizabeth Florescu, Treasurer; Ibon Zugasti; Paul Saffo; Sirkka Heinonen
- Website: millennium-project.org

The Millennium Project is an independent global futures research think tank that conducts participatory foresight and long-term policy analysis through an international network of regional nodes. It was established in 1996 following a three-year feasibility study conducted in collaboration with the United Nations University, the Smithsonian Institution, The Futures Group, and the American Council for the United Nations University.

The organization coordinates contributions from experts in academia, government, business, and civil society to examine long-term global challenges and emerging issues. Its work is synthesized into recurring publications, including the State of the Future reports and the Futures Research Methodology series, as well as numerous thematic futures studies.

== About ==
The Millennium Project coordinates a long-term participatory futures research process that gathers and synthesizes expert judgments through a global network of regional nodes. According to its published methodology, the project has engaged thousands of participants worldwide since its inception, with findings consolidated into its State of the Future reports, the Futures Research Methodology series, and numerous thematic futures studies.

== Node network ==
The Millennium Project operates through a distributed network of regional and national “Nodes”—groups of individuals and institutions that connect local perspectives with the Project’s global foresight activities. Nodes contribute by identifying experts for participation and supporting research activities at the regional level, while results are synthesized into global publications.

According to the organization, Nodes may also assist with activities such as translating questionnaires and reports and convening interviews, workshops, and related futures research events.

== History ==
The Millennium Project was founded in 1996 following a three-year feasibility study conducted in collaboration with the United Nations University, the Smithsonian Institution, The Futures Group International, and the American Council for the United Nations University. In 2001 it was associated with the American Council for the United Nations University. By 2007 it had become a part of the World Federation of United Nations Associations By 2009 it had become an independent non-profit global futures research think tank operating through an international network of regional nodes.

== Mission and vision ==
According to the organization, the Millennium Project’s mission is to improve thinking about the future and to make that thinking widely available through multiple media in order to support better decision-making.

The organization states that its vision is to develop a global foresight network of regional nodes, information resources, and software tools intended to function as a collective intelligence system supporting long-term global decision-making.

== Publications ==
The Millennium Project produces several recurring and thematic publications based on its global foresight work.

=== State of the Future ===
The organization has published the annual State of the Future report since 1997. These reports provide assessments of global trends, challenges, and policy options and have been translated into multiple languages. The 20th edition (State of the Future 20.0) was released in 2024 and examines issues including technological change and governance of emerging technologies.

=== Futures Research Methodology series ===
The Millennium Project publishes the Futures Research Methodology series, a comprehensive collection of methods and tools for systematic futures studies originally compiled as an internationally peer-reviewed handbook.

=== Governance of Artificial General Intelligence ===
The Project has also produced major works on the governance of artificial general intelligence (AGI), including titles such as Global Governance of the Transition to Artificial General Intelligence: Issues and Requirements (2025) and related thematic reports addressing global governance challenges posed by AGI.
