= CGNET Services International =

American early email communications provider for non-profit sector

- Type: Privately held company
- Industry: Information Technology
- Founded: 1985; 41 years ago in Palo Alto
- Founder: Georg Lindsey and the Consultative Group for International Agricultural Research (CGIAR)
- Headquarters: Mountain View, California, United States
- Area served: Worldwide
- Products: Email, cloud storage, managed services, technology assessment for non-profits
- Number of employees: 10 (2025)
- Website: cgnet.com

CGNET Services International is an American information technology provider based in Mountain View, California. It is an early pioneer in international data communications. Beginning with landmark achievements in the 1980s and 1990s, CGNET has become one of the world's most well-known email providers in the international nonprofit community.

== History ==
Founded in 1983 by Georg Lindsey, CGNET built some of the earliest international email networks, providing custom email services over the Dialcom network in 1984, and later moved to the Internet.

Before the Internet, organizations usually sent mail over private data networks. While individuals could use email services on some value-added carriers, they had not been configured to serve organizations. CGNET changed this when it set up organizational communications over Dialcom. In the 1990s, it performed a similar feat by providing its customers with an early version of Voice over IP, which did not use the VoIP protocols but made it possible to transmit voice over IP networks using statistical multiplexing.

CGNET's first client was the Consultative Group on International Agricultural Research (CGIAR), from which CGNET derived its name. Since then, virtually all of its customers are reported as nonprofits, foundations or non-governmental organizations. CGNET's international experience includes several times when it has relocated clients' facilities or rerouted their email because their offices have been caught in the middle of armed rebellions or similar disorders.
