= Global Scenario Group =

International policy development body

The Global Scenario Group (GSG) was an international, interdisciplinary body convened in 1995 by the Tellus Institute and the Stockholm Environment Institute (SEI) to develop scenarios for world development in the twenty-first century. Further development of the Great Transition scenarios has been carried on by the Great Transition Initiative.

== History ==
The work of the Global Scenario Group was widely adopted in high-level intergovernmental settings. The scenarios informed numerous international assessments, including the World Water Council's World Water Vision report in 1999–2000, the OECD Environmental Outlook in 2001, the Intergovernmental Panel on Climate Change's greenhouse gas emission mitigation assessment in 2001, the United Nations Environment Programme's Third GEO Report in 2002, and the Millennium Ecosystem Assessment in 2005.

Members of the GSG included Tariq Banuri, Khaled Mohamed Fahmy, Tibor Farago, Nadezhda Gaponenko, Gilberto Gallopín, Gordon Goodman, Pablo Gutman, Allen Hammond, Roger Kasperson, Bob Kates, Laili Li, Sam Moyo, Madiodio Niasse, H.W.O. Okoth-Ogendo, Atiq Rahman, Paul Raskin, Setijati D. Sastrapradja, Katsuo Seiki, Nicholas Sonntag, Rob Swart, and Veerle Vandeweerd.

Several of the GSG participants who actively participated in the IPCC assessments were recognized for contributing to the 2007 award of the Nobel Peace Prize to the IPCC.

In 2002, the GSG formally summarized their scenario approach in an essay called Great Transition: The Promise and Lure of the Times Ahead.

=== Great Transition ===
"Great Transition" is a term used by the Global Scenario Group to describe a vision of a just and sustainable global future. The term was originally coined by Kenneth E. Boulding in The Meaning of the 20th Century – The Great Transition (1964) and describes the shift from pre-modern to post-modern culture, and the four possible courses of action that these organizations believe will allow humanity to successfully manage the Great Transition.

Elements of the Great Transition vision include egalitarian social and ecological values, increased inter-human connectivity, improved quality of life, and a healthy planet, as well as the absence of poverty, war, and environmental destruction. The Great Transition concept was cited by Prime Minister of Bhutan Jigme Thinley, Josh Ryan-Collins of the New Economics Foundation, and the Capital Institute. It was used as a theme for the 2011 SmartCSOs conference on strategies for Civil Society Organisations in London.

The Great Transition was first introduced at an international body of scientists convened in 1995 by the Tellus Institute and Stockholm Environment Institute to examine the requirements for a transition to a sustainable global society. The GSG set out to describe and analyze scenarios for the future of the earth as it entered a planetary phase of civilization.

== See also ==
- Globalization
- Post-capitalism
- Transition scenario
- Tellus Institute
- Stockholm Environment Institute
- Scenario analysis
- Anthropocene
- Global Citizens Movement
- Planetary boundaries
- Transition town
- Tellus Institute

== Publications ==
- Parris, Thomas. "Bytes of Note: A Crystal Ball for Sustainability." Environment: Science and Policy for Sustainable Development. 44, no. 7 (2002): 3–4. 10.1080/00139150209605799#.VZmxB0bLdyE http://www.tandfonline.com/doi/abs/10.1080/00139150209605799#.VZmxB0bLdyE.
- Rajan, Chella, Global Politics and Institutions. Boston: Tellus Institute, 2006.
- Raskin, Paul. GT Today: A Report from the Future. Boston: Tellus Institute, 2006.
- Raskin, Paul. Journey to Earthland: A Great Transition to Planetary Civilization. Boston: Tellus Institute, 2016.
- Revkin, Andy. Human Impact on the Earth - How Do We Soften It? International Herald Tribune. September 4, 2002.
- Stutz, John. The Role of Well-Being in a Great Transition. Boston: Tellus Institute, 2006.
- White, Allen. Transforming the Corporation. Boston: Tellus Institute, 2006.
