= The Futures Academy =

The Futures Academy logo

The Futures Academy is an applied research and strategic consultancy organization. It was established in January 2003 and located in the Faculty of the Built Environment in the Dublin Institute of Technology, Ireland.

The Futures Academy was created to provide a creative approach towards strategic planning in Ireland by providing professional guidance to those agencies, organisations and individuals concerned with making business decisions "into the needs of a future world."

== Aims ==
The main aims of the Futures Academy include:

- Testing policies directed towards evolving a sustainable future.
- Identifying ‘key drivers of change' that might impact on the future of sustainable development.
- Providing executive training and trans-disciplinary education in the concepts, methods and techniques of Futures Studies.
- Developing an approach for decision-makers and practitioners involved in planning that will lead to successful solutions.
