= The Bakken =

Science museum in Minneapolis, Minnesota

The Bakken Museum
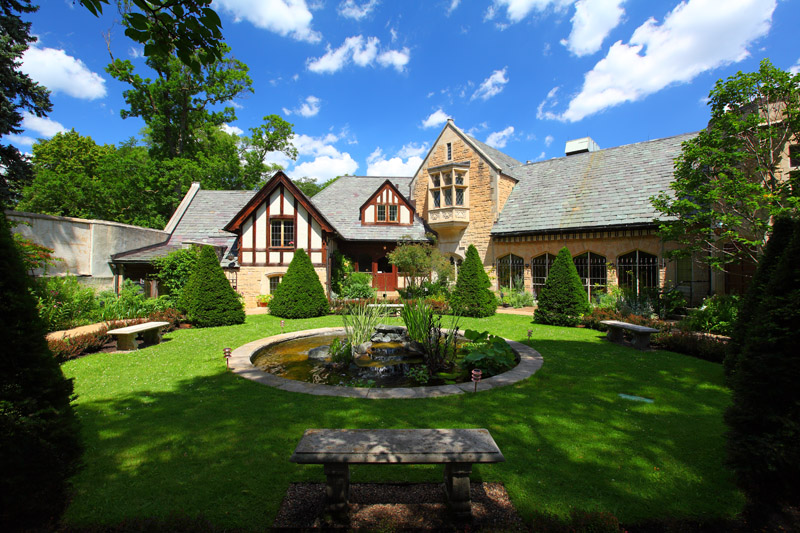
- A view of The Bakken Museum from the medicinal garden
- Established: 1975–1976
- Location: 3537 Zenith Avenue South, Minneapolis, Minnesota, United States
- Coordinates: 44°56′17″N 93°19′15″W
- Type: Science museum
- Director: Jennifer Hensley
- Website: www.thebakken.org

The Bakken Museum (/ˈbɑːkən/ BAH-kən) is a museum in Minneapolis, Minnesota, United States. The Bakken was founded in 1975 by Earl Bakken, the co-founder of Medtronic, and includes exhibits on science, technology, and the humanities. It also includes a substantial exhibit dedicated to Mary Shelley's classic novel Frankenstein.

== History ==
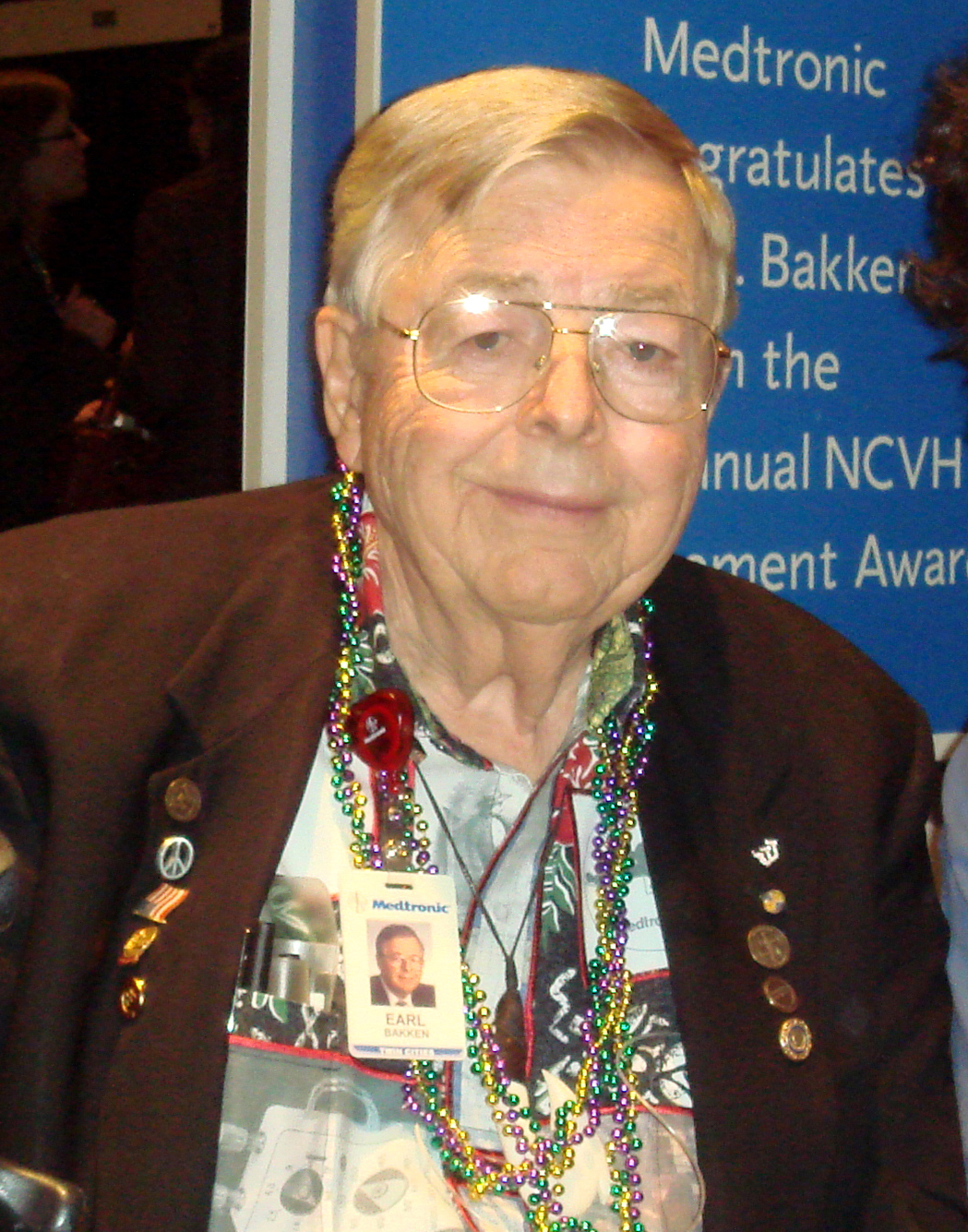
Inventor Earl Bakken, co-founder of Medtronic

The Bakken Museum was established by inventor Earl Bakken, who also founded the medical technology company Medtronic in 1949. Bakken had always been fascinated with electricity and innovation. During his childhood, he, a self-identified "nerd," conceived a basic electroshock device at school as a means of repelling bullies.

At Bakken's proposal in 1969, Dennis Stillings, then employed in Medtronic's library, initiated the acquisition of books and devices. By 1974, the collection had garnered recognition within antiquarian circles and was presented with two assortments of early electrical devices. Initially housed at the Medtronic headquarters in Saint Anthony Village, Minnesota, the collection expanded to occupy a floor in the Medtronic branch office in Brooklyn Center, Minnesota by 1975. In 1976, the exhibit started relocating to its current site.

Previously sponsored by the museum, the Bakken Quartet showcased chamber music performances onsite. Presently, the ensemble operates under the name Bakken Trio and continues to deliver musical performances in Saint Paul, Minnesota.

== Collections and exhibits ==
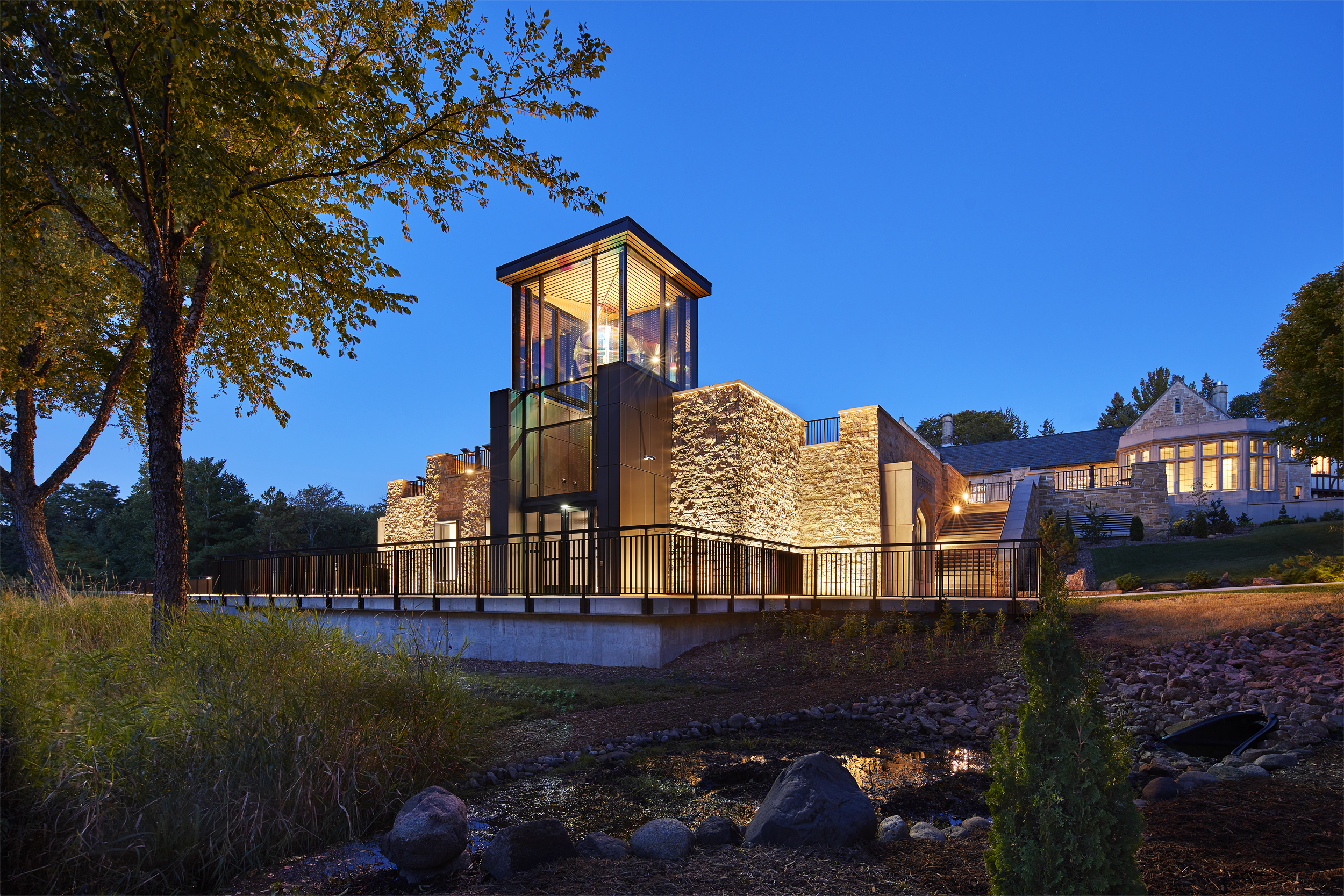
The Bakken Museum's Icon and front entrance post renovation

The museum houses approximately 11,000 written works and around 2,000 scientific instruments, with a particular focus on electrophysiology and electrotherapeutics. Notable holdings include works authored by Jean Antoine Nollet, Benjamin Franklin, Giovanni Battista Beccaria, Luigi Galvani, Giovanni Aldini, Alessandro Volta, Guillame Benjamin Amand Duchenne, and Emil Heinrich Du Bois-Reymond. The museum also holds journals such as Annalen der Physik, the Philosophical Transactions, Proceedings of the Royal Society, and Zeitschrift für Physik.

The museum has an exhibit dedicated to Frankenstein, which explores the intersection of electricity and medicine depicted in Mary Shelley's novel. The novel, as well as the subsequent 1931 film adaptation featuring Boris Karloff, directly influenced Bakken's pursuit of invention. Bakken's endeavors culminated in his invention of the pacemaker and the establishment of Medtronic.

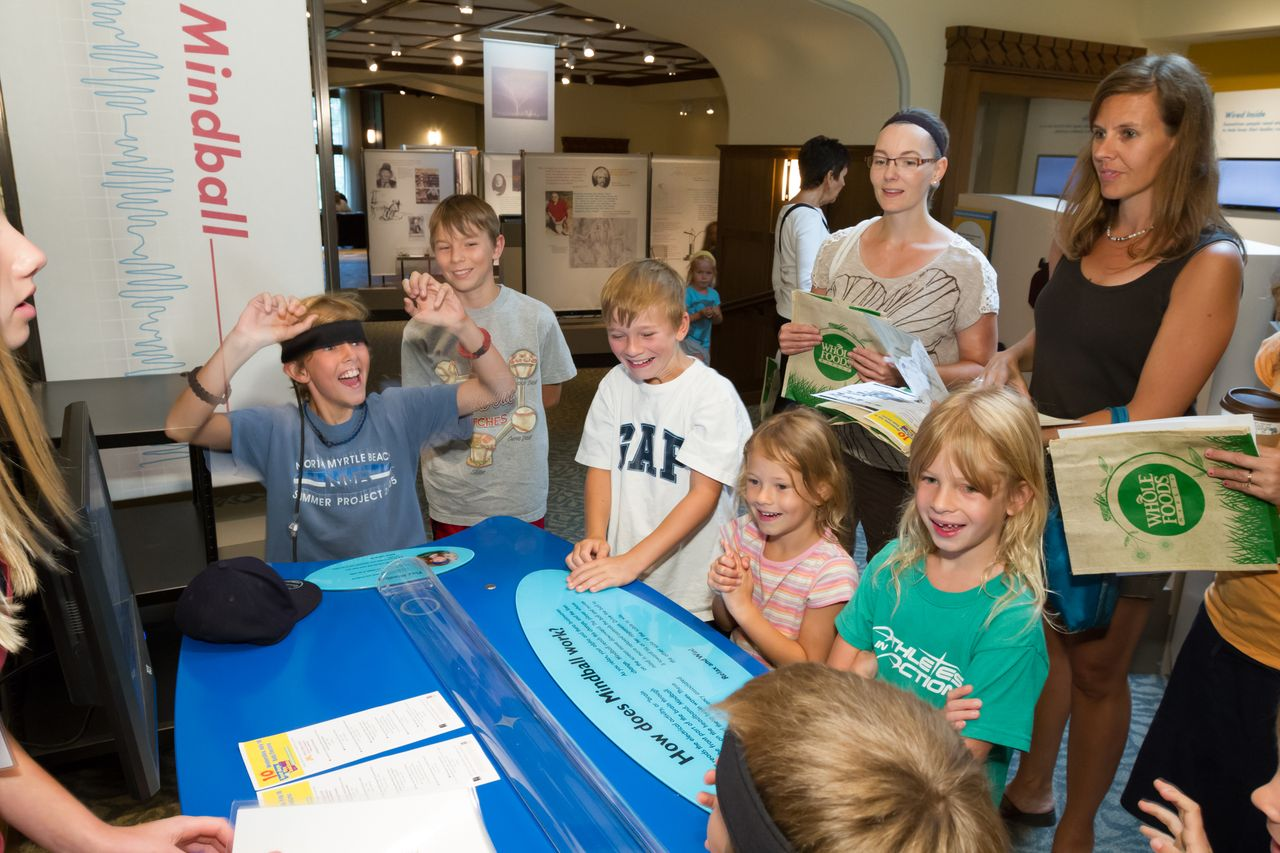
A family playing a round of Mindball at The Bakken Museum

The museum's permanent exhibits are

=== Exhibits ===
- Spark is the Bakken Museum's latest exhibit, delving into the iterative processes of innovation and creativity.
- Frankenstein’s Laboratory is an object theater featuring Frankenstein’s monster.
- Deep Roots: Plants as Medicine discusses modern preconceptions about the relationship between plants and wellness.
- Ben Franklin’s Electricity Party allows visitors to try out electric party tricks similar to those conducted by Ben Franklin and other scientists during electricity parties in the 1700s.
- Mary and Her Monster See Mary Shelley’s magic bookcase filled with artifacts and books from The Bakken collection, solve the puzzle of Frankenstein’s story illustrated by artist Zak Sally, and meet a living portrait of Mary that allows visitors to hear about the people, science, art and culture that inspired her.
- The Florence Bakken Medicinal Garden, along with a statue of Hermes (or Mercury), the messenger god of Ancient Greece and Rome, serve as prominent features of the museum's grounds.

== Facility ==
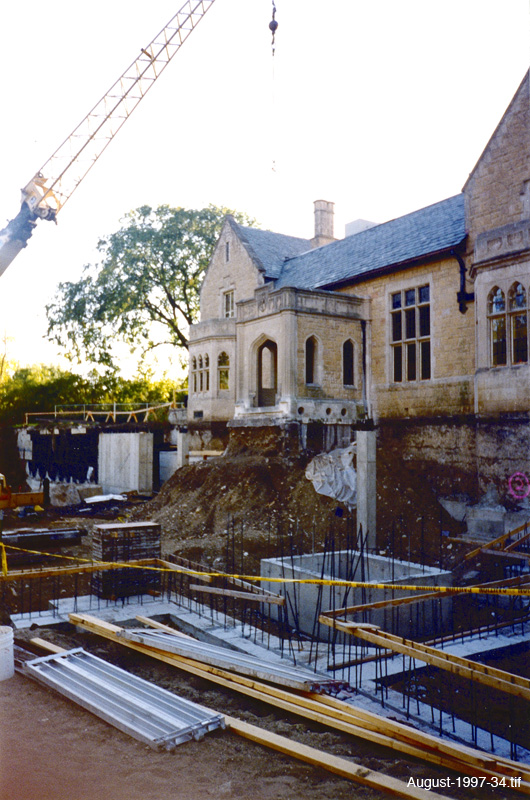
Construction of the museum expansion - August 1997.

Architect Carl A. Gage constructed the building between 1928 and 1930 as the residence of William Goodfellow, who had sold his dry goods store in 1904 to George Dayton, the founder of what is now Target Corporation. Reflecting a blend of 16th-century English architectural styles, including Tudor and Gothic Revival, the home was christened "West Winds" and boasted features such as dark wood interior paneling, open-beamed ceilings, grouped and arched windows, and stained glass. Originally comprising fifteen rooms and eleven bathrooms, the property was bequeathed to the Girl Scouts upon Goodfellow's passing in 1944. Subsequently, the Cornelius family occupied the residence from 1953 to 1976, after which it transitioned into the Bakken Museum.

In 1999, the museum underwent an expansion project, effectively doubling its size from 13,000 square feet (1,208 square meters) to 25,000 square feet (2,323 square meters). An underground vault measuring 1,200 square feet (111 square meters), constructed in 1981, safeguards the collection by maintaining a consistent temperature of 65 °F (18 °C) and a relative humidity of 55 percent.

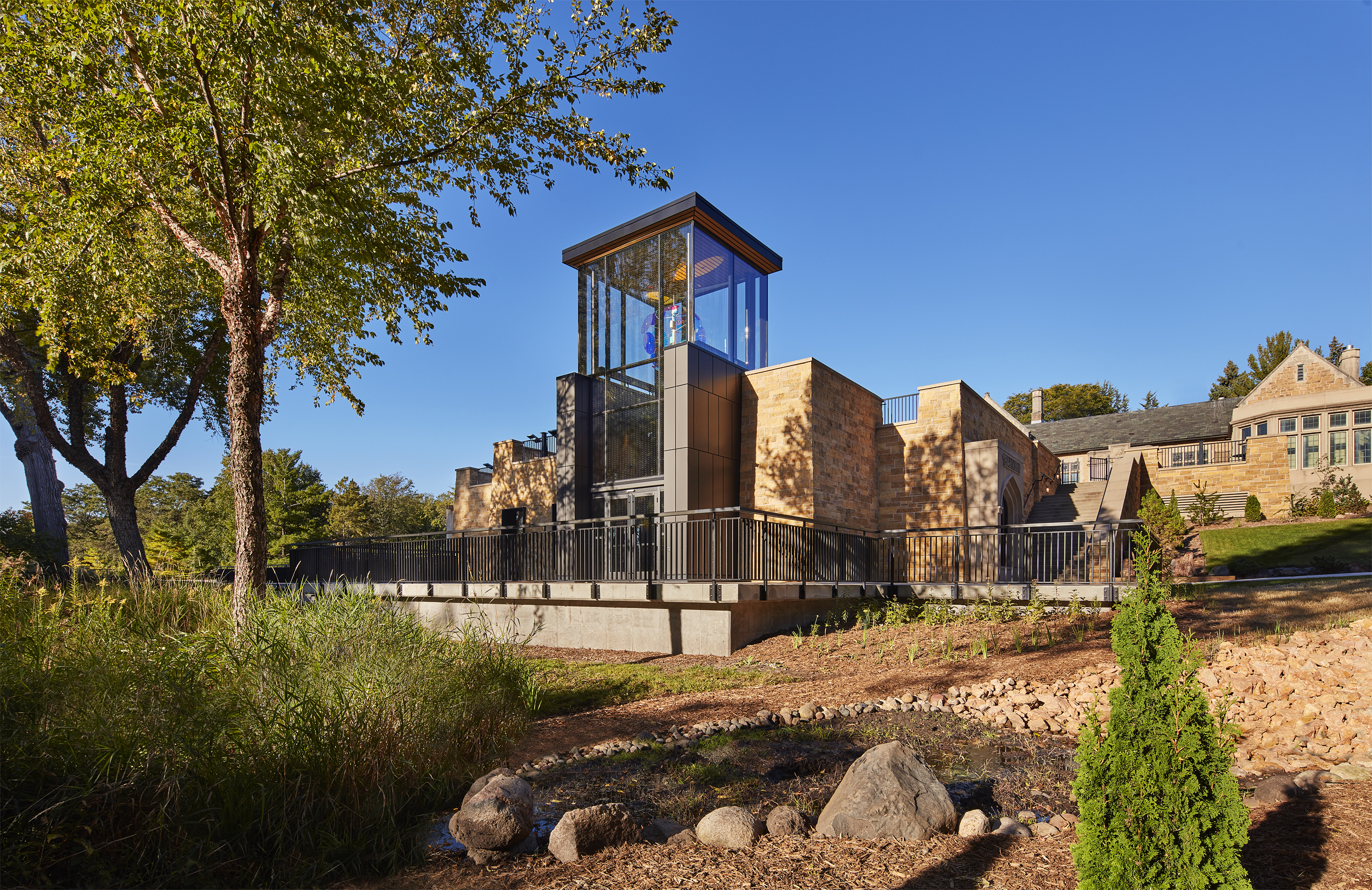
The Bakken Museum after 2019 renovations

=== 2019 Renovations ===
In 2019, the museum building went under a major renovation that included the construction of a new entrance, a 3,200-square-foot outdoor walkway, and an additional 8,400-square-foot interior expansion that modernized the lobby, classrooms, makerspace, and exhibit spaces.

== Gallery ==
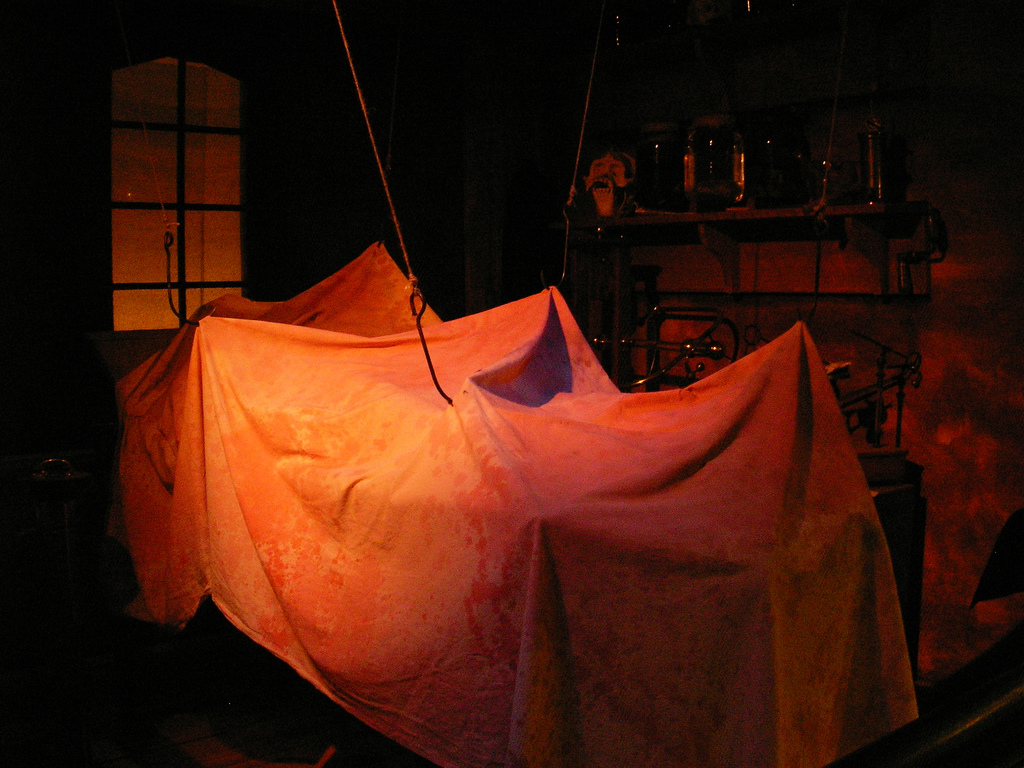
A Frankenstein display

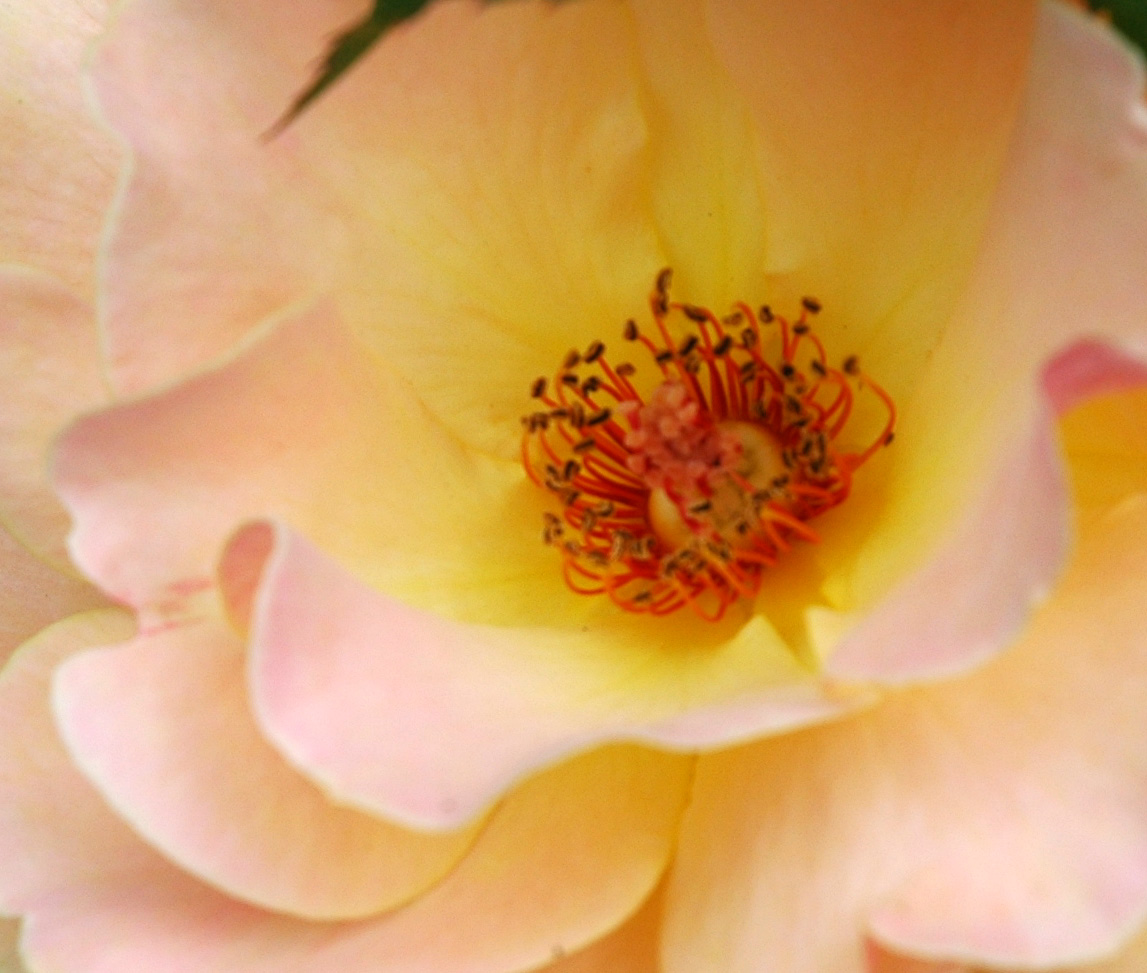
Flower in a Bakken garden

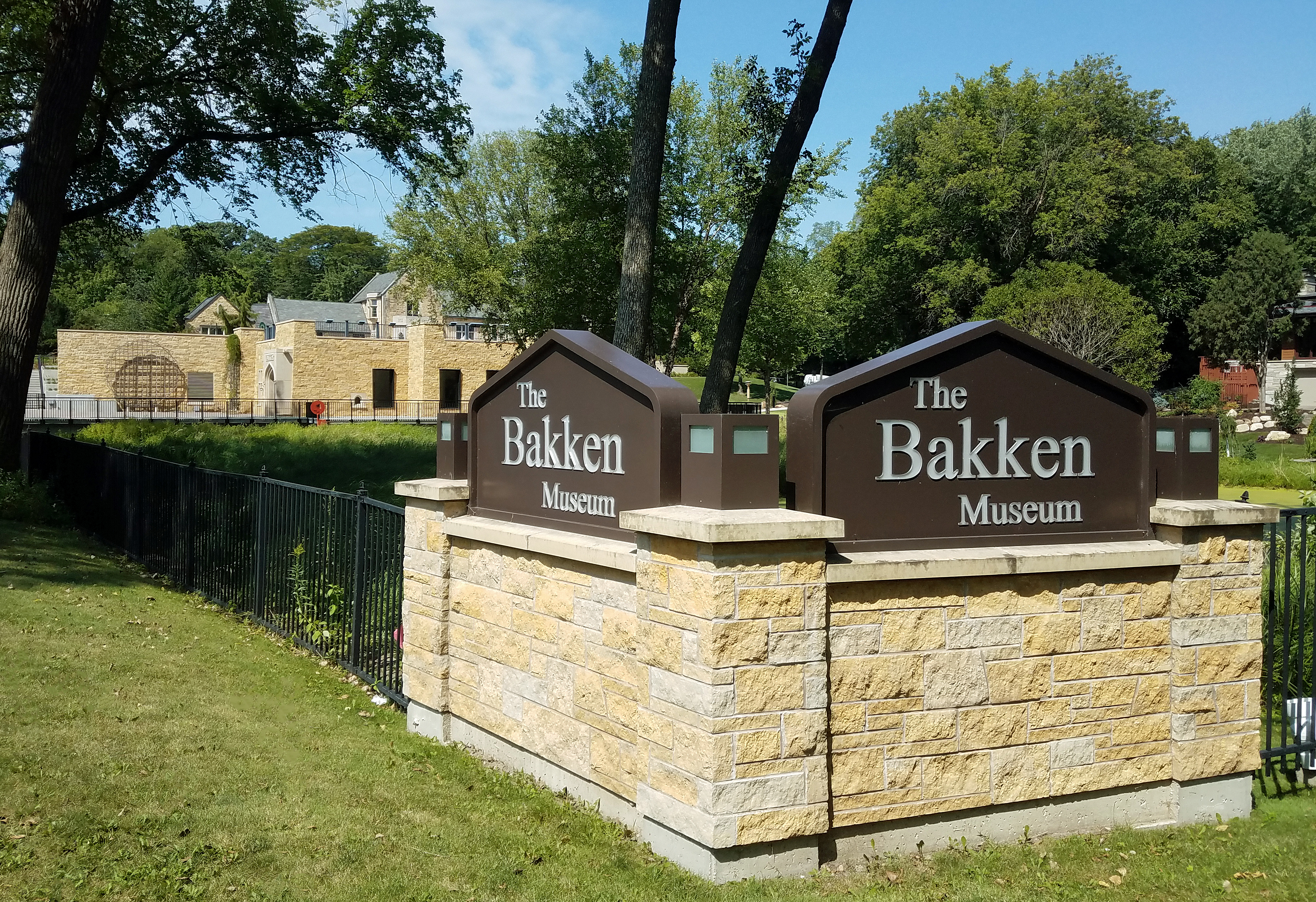
Bakken Museum sign

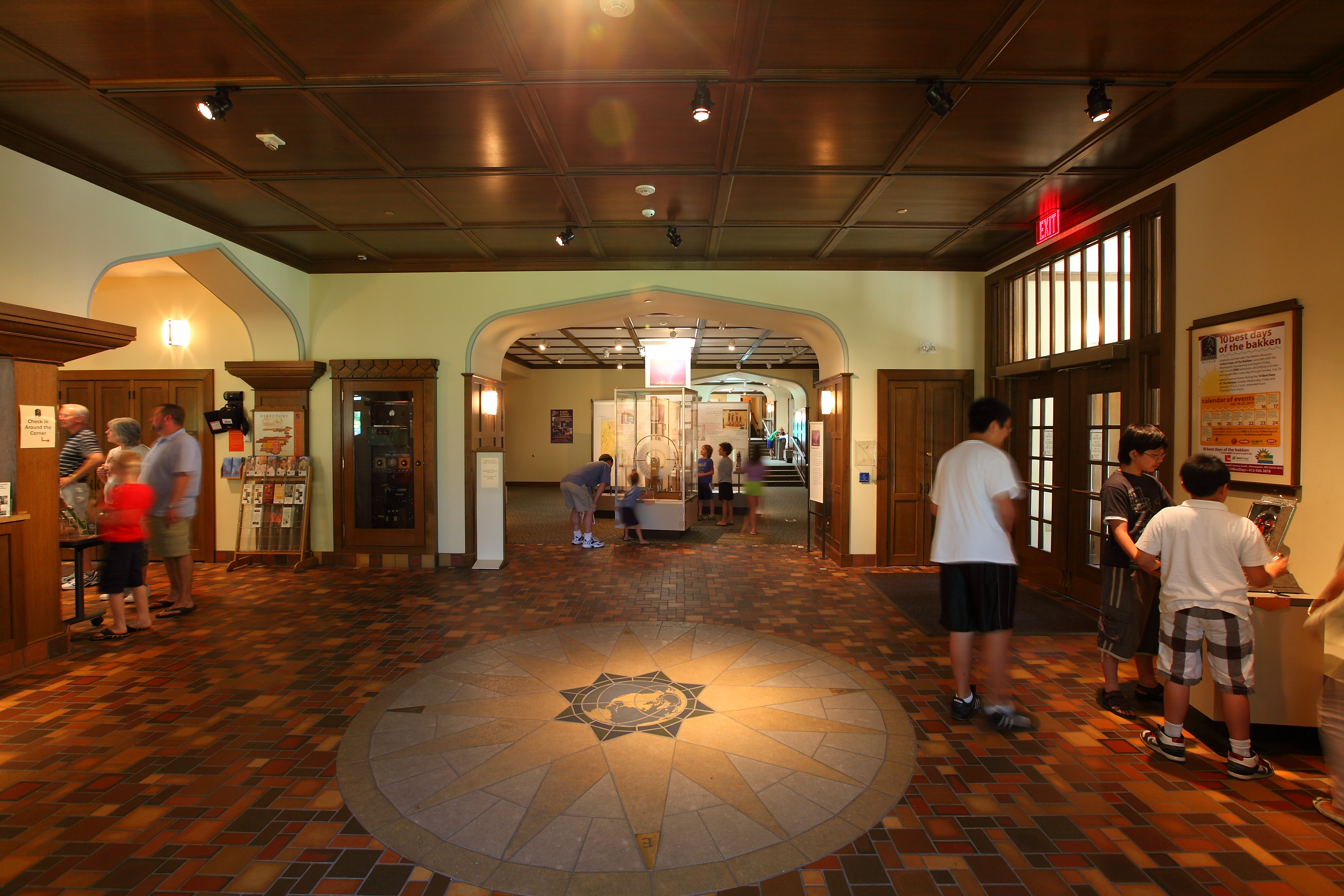
Inside the museum before it was renovated

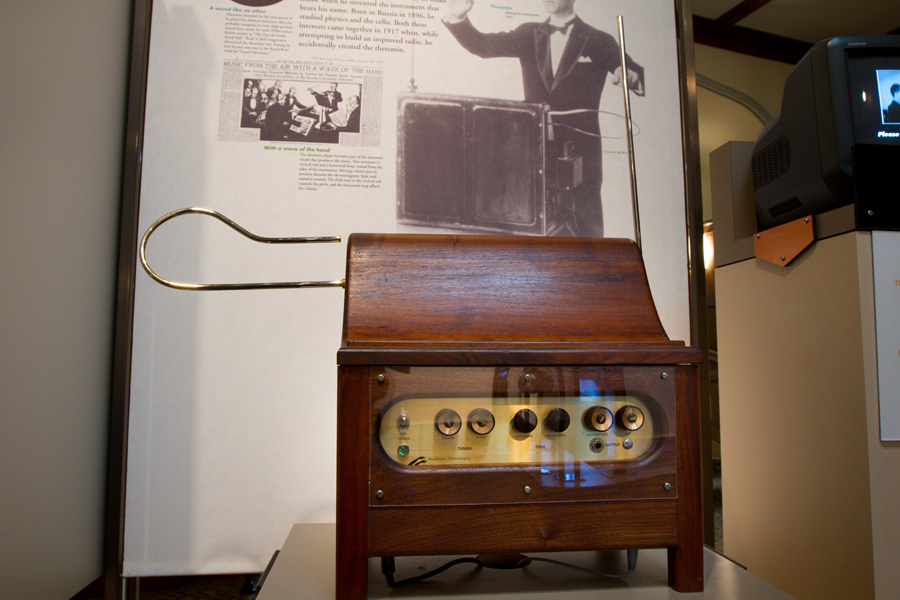
Theremin display, which visitors can play

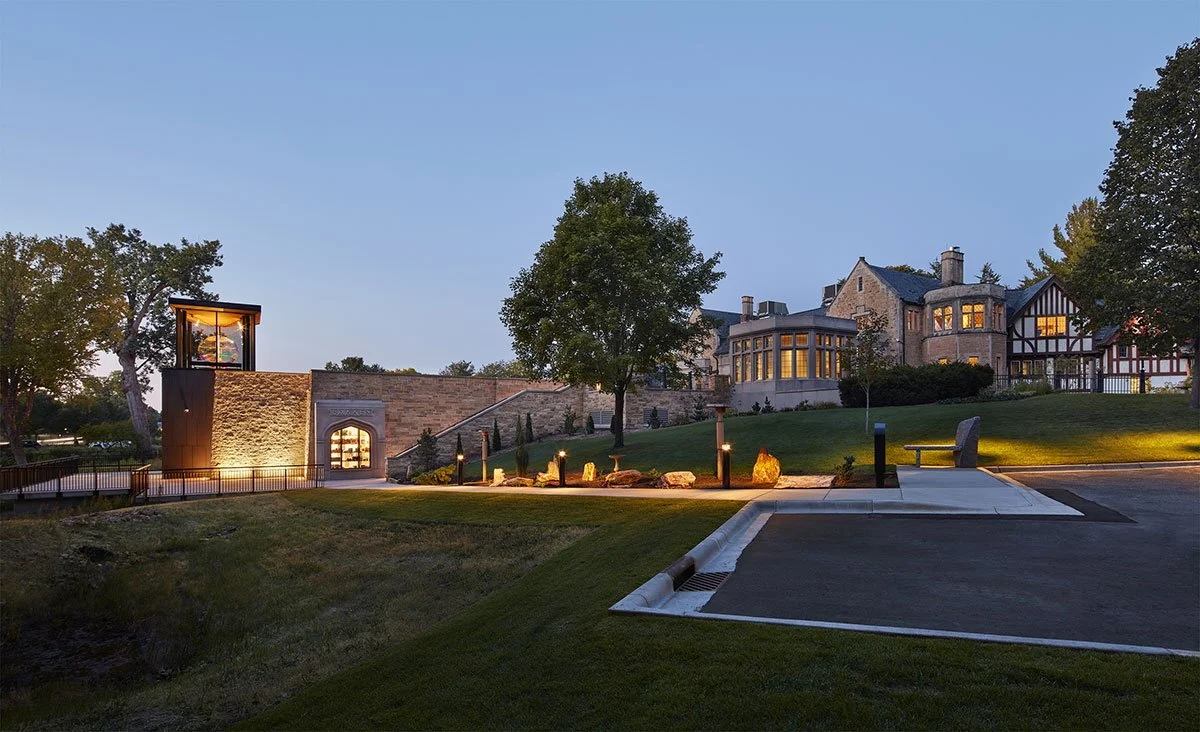
Panoramic view of the exterior of The Bakken Museum

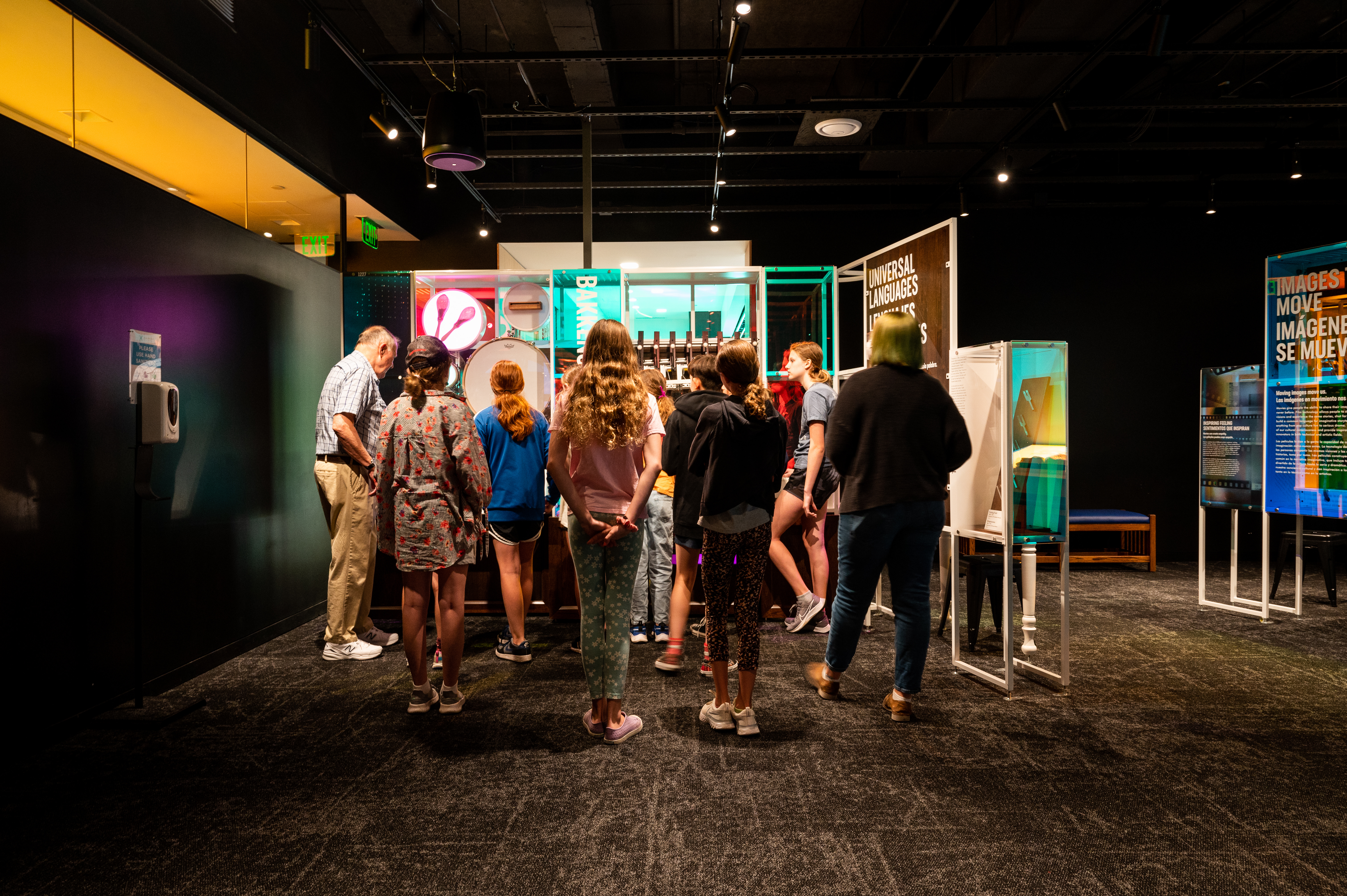
Group of students in the Spark Exhibit after renovations
