= Planetary phase of civilization =

Speculative concept, global human unification

The planetary phase of civilization is a term created by the Global Scenario Group (GSG) to describe the contemporary era in which increasing global interdependence and risks are binding the world into a unitary socio-ecological system. Characteristics of this phase include economic globalization, biospheric destabilization, mass migration, new global institutions, the Internet, new forms of transboundary conflict, and shifts in culture and consciousness.

== Background ==
The notion of the planetary phase of civilization derives from the work of the Global Scenario Group, an international and interdisciplinary body convened in 1995 to examine alternative long-range futures. The GSG synthesized its findings for a non-technical audience in the essay Great Transition: The Promise and Lure of the Times Ahead.

According to the GSG, the planetary phase of civilization is the third significant transition in civilization, following the shift from Stone Age culture to Early Civilization, and from Early Civilization to the Modern Era. The planetary phase sees social organization, the economy, and communications move to the global level. Some argue that it constitutes a new geologic era, the Anthropocene, in which human activity becomes the dominant driver of changes to the Earth system.

The GSG argued that historical transitions have been accelerating. Thus, the duration of the Stone Age was on the order of 100,000 years; Early Civilization, 10,000; and Modernity, 1,000. If the planetary phase takes shape over 100 years, the pattern would continue.

== Future scenarios ==
The GSG groups the possibilities for how the planetary phase could unfold into three broad scenario types: Conventional Worlds, Barbarization, and Great Transitions. Conventional Worlds assume the persistence of currently dominant institutions and cultural values, and Barbarization scenarios are marked by social devolution. Great Transition futures, by contrast, incorporate new institutions rooted in the ascendance of a new suite of values – solidarity, ecological stewardship, well-being – powered by the emergence of a global citizens movement as a potential actor to counter the power of transnational corporations, state governments, and mainstream values.

== See also ==
- Global warming
- Great Transition
- Kardashev scale
- Global Scenario Group
- Tellus Institute
- Scenario analysis
- Anthropocene
- World Government
