= Thorkil Kristensen =

Danish economist and politician (1899–1989)

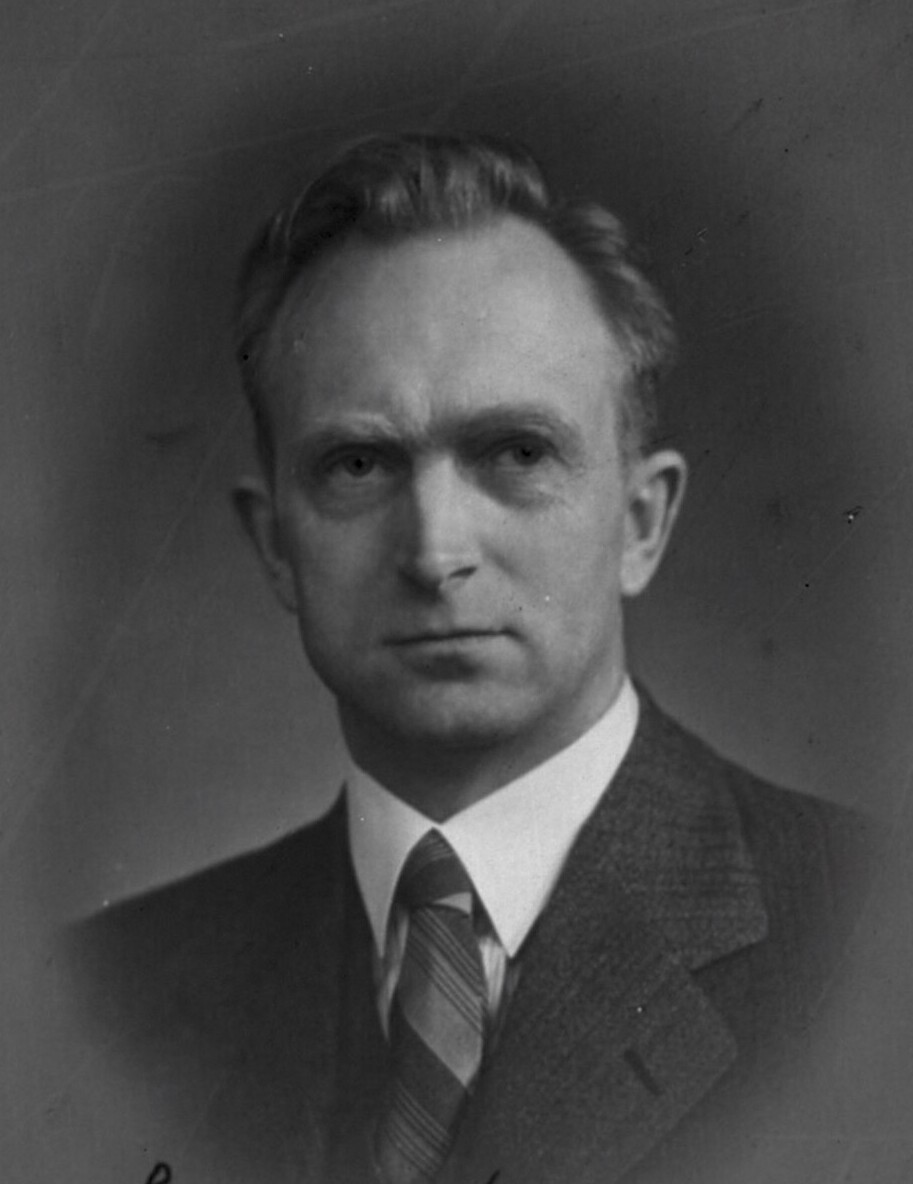

1st Secretary-General of the OECD
- In office 30 September 1961 – 30 September 1969
- Preceded by: Position established
- Succeeded by: Emiel van Lennep

3rd Secretary-General of the OEEC
- In office 1960 – 30 September 1961
- Preceded by: René Sergent
- Succeeded by: Position abolished

Minister of Finance
- In office 30 October 1950 – 30 September 1953
- Prime Minister: Erik Eriksen
- Preceded by: Viggo Kampmann
- Succeeded by: Viggo Kampmann
- In office 7 November 1945 – 13 November 1947
- Prime Minister: Knud Kristensen
- Preceded by: H. C. Hansen
- Succeeded by: H. C. Hansen

Personal details
- Born: 9 October 1899 Fløjstrup, Denmark
- Died: 26 June 1989 (aged 89) Birkerød, Denmark

Thorkil Kristensen (9 October 1899 – 26 June 1989) was a Danish politician, finance minister, professor in national economy, and futurist.

== Early years ==
Kristensen was born a son of a farmer in Fløjstrup close to Vejle, Denmark. Between 1938–1945 he was professor at the University of Aarhus and between 1947–1960 at the Copenhagen Business School.

== Career ==
Thorkil Kristensen was elected to the Danish Parliament 1945 and became finance minister under Knud Kristiansen (1945–1947) and Erik Eriksen (1950–1953). Throughout his life he worked with difficult economic problems. Among people of his own party and opposing parties, he enjoyed great respect because of his broad knowledge of economics.

He came to disagree on economic policy with his party, Venstre, and left the party in 1960.

After his exit from politics, he was secretary general of the OECD from 1960-1969. He was the founder of the Copenhagen Institute for Futures Studies (CIFS), making it one of the first futures research institutes on the European continent. He was managing director at CIFS from 1970–1988.

He participated in the Club of Rome which attracted considerable public attention with its report, Limits to Growth, which has sold 30 million copies in more than 30 translations, making it the best selling environmental book in world history.

== Selected publications ==
- Kristensen, Thorkil. The economic world balance. The economic world balance. (1960).
- Kristensen, Thorkil. The brain drain and development planning. No. 29. International Institute for Educational Planning, 1968.
- Kristensen, Thorkil. The food problem of developing countries. Organisation for Economic Cooperation and Development, 1968.
- Kristensen, Thorkil. Development in rich and poor countries: a general theory with statistical analyses. Praeger, 1974.'

Articles, a selection

- Kristensen, Thorkil. "Five Years of OECD." European Yearbook 13 (1967): 1000-113.
