= Copenhagen Institute for Futures Studies =

Danish not-for-profit

- Company type: Non-profit
- Industry: Advisory
- Founded: 1969; 57 years ago
- Founder: Thorkil Kristensen
- Headquarters: Bryghusgade 8, BLOXHUB, Copenhagen, Denmark
- Key people: Daria Krivonos (CEO)
- Products: FARSIGHT magazine, various publications & reports.
- Services: Scenario planning processes, strategic advisory projects, presentations, courses, multi-stakeholder think tanks
- Number of employees: 24 (2020)
- Website: www.cifs.dk

The Copenhagen Institute for Futures Studies (Danish: Instituttet for Fremtidsforskning) is a Danish not-for-profit, independent futures think tank founded in 1969 by Thorkil Kristensen, former OECD Secretary-General for the betterment of society. The Institute's mission is to facilitate knowledge about potential futures and it hosts various events during the year and collaborate on others, in Denmark and abroad. Lastly the Institute produce several publications, such as reports, magazines and books.

The Copenhagen Institute for Futures Studies is organised as an association consisting of a wide range of member organisations and individuals. CIFS is not associated with any specific university or governmental body. The Institute's products include seminars, analyses, reports, courses, newsletters, books, and the magazine FARSIGHT. The work at the Institute rests on the assumptions outlined by military strategist Herman Kahn in his book: The Year 2000: A Framework for Speculation on the Next Thirty-three Years, and later adapted for strategic business planning by Pierre Wack from Royal Dutch Shell.

== History ==
The Copenhagen Institute for Futures Studies was founded in 1969 by Professor Thorkil Kristensen, a member of the Club of Rome who had previously been the Danish Minister of Finance and later the OECD Secretary-General. The organisation was established in collaboration with a number of Danish organisations who had a desire to qualify their decision-making basis through futures studies.

Thorkil Kristensen was the CEO of the Institute from 1969 to 1988, after which Rolf Jensen took over until 2000. During this period, the Institute published the book The Dream Society, which became an international bestseller and was translated to several languages. From 2000 to 2013, the international outlook was expanded under the leadership of first Johan Peter Paludan and later Axel Olesen, and an especially Nordic focus characterised the circle of members and projects. In 2004 CIFS published the follow-up to The Dream Society, the book Creative Man. In 2010 CIFS launched the print magazine SCENARIO (since renamed FARSIGHT), which has since been sold from newsstands around the world.

In 2019, the Institute became the facilitator of the Nordic Health 2030 Movement, a multi-stakeholder initiative intended to create collaboration around the future of health.

=== List of CEOs ===
- Thorkil Kristensen (1969-1972, 1973-1988)
- Niels Ivar Bech (1972-1973)
- Rolf Jensen (1988-2000)
- Johan Peter Paludan (2001-2004)
- Axel Olesen (2004-2013)
- Claus Kjeldsen (2013-2018)
- Daria Krivonos (2018-

== Work ==
The Copenhagen Institute for Futures Studies research covers a wide variety of topics from identification and statistically based analysis of global trends to subjective and emotional responses to the future. The work of the Institute is interdisciplinary, and its staff covers a number of academic disciplines and professional backgrounds, including astrophysics, biochemistry, literature, history, theology, sociology, political science, cultural studies, business studies, and economics.

=== FARSIGHT Magazine ===
The institute publishes a quarterly magazine called FARSIGHT.

Some of the Institute's books include:

- Jensen, Rolf. The Dream Society: How the Coming Shift from Information to Imagination will Transform your Business
- Mogensen, Klaus Æ. Creative Man: The Future Consumer, Employee, and Citizen

The Institute is the Danish Partner of the EUROCONSTRUCT network, which provides analysis and forecasts of construction in 19 Western and Central Eastern European countries.
