= Tellus Institute =

American environmental think tank founded in 1976

- Formation: 1976; 50 years ago
- Type: Non-profit organization
- President: Paul Raskin
- Website: https://www.tellus.org/

The Tellus Institute is an American non-profit organization established in 1976 with the aim of bringing scientific rigor and systemic vision to critical environmental and social issues. Tellus has conducted thousands of projects throughout the world, and now focuses on the global future and how to shape it.

== Background ==
Tellus has partnered with hundreds of organizations, notably the Stockholm Environmental Institute, with which it coordinated programs from 1989 to 2006. The institute has conducted more than 3,500 studies worldwide. The methodology of Tellus projects has been the development of alternative scenarios of the future in order to identify and evaluate alternative paths of action. To that end, the institute developed a widely used family of scenario planning tools, including the Long range Energy Alternatives Planning system (LEAP), which facilitates energy-environment planning; the Water Evaluation and Planning System (WEAP); and PoleStar, for comprehensive sustainability planning.

== Research and programs ==
The question of the long-range global future theme has increasingly dominated Tellus’s work since the 1980s. In particular, the institute was active in developing integrated approaches and methods for exploring alternative climate change and sustainable development scenarios. Toward that end, Tellus convened the international and interdisciplinary Global Scenario Group to examine global scenarios for the twenty-first century, work that has been relied on in various UN reports and futures studies.

Building on this legacy, the institute has reframed its mission, focusing on research, scholarship, and network-building for advancing a just and sustainable planetary civilization. This “Great Transition” would entail a fundamental shift in human values and the ways we produce, consume, and live.

== See also ==
- Sustainable development
- Globalization
- Global Reporting Initiative
- Paul Raskin
- Great Transition
- Scenario analysis
- Global Scenario Group
