= Hotwash =

Rapid evaluation discussion after an event

A hot wash is the immediate "after-action" discussions and evaluations of an agency's (or multiple agencies') performance following an exercise, training session, or major event, such as Hurricane Katrina.

The main purpose of a hot wash session is to identify strengths and weaknesses of the response to a given event, which then leads to another governmental phase known as "lessons learned". Hot washes are intended to guide future responses in order to avoid repeating errors made in the past. A hot wash normally includes all the parties that participated in the exercise or response activities. These events are usually used to create the after action review/improvement plan.

Hot wash is a term picked up in recent years by the Emergency Preparedness Community, likely as a result of Homeland Security and other government agencies' involvement in disaster planning. It serves as a form of after-disaster briefing for all parties involved to analyze what worked well, what needs improvement, what person or agency needs to be responsible for said improvements, and the assignments and timelines for the noted corrective and proactive improvements to be in place.

== Origin ==
The term hotwash originated in the U.S. Army:

The term Hot Wash comes from the practice used by some soldiers of dousing their weapons in extremely hot water as a means of removing grit and residue after firing. While this practice by no means eliminates the need to properly break down the weapon later for cleaning, it removes the major debris and ensures the cleaning process goes more smoothly. One infantry soldier described it as "the quick and dirty cleaning that can save a lot of time later."

— Safe Schools Newsletter, US Department of Defense Education Activity

It is also commonly used in the Coast Guard and other seagoing services to describe the use of a fine spray mist of water and lubricants to prevent corrosion in helicopter turbines operated in a heavily saltwater-saturated marine environment.

== See also ==
- After-action review
- After action report
- Debriefing
- Lessons learned
- Postmortem documentation
- Retrospective
