= Future-oriented technology analysis =

Futures studies term

Future-oriented technology analysis (FTA) is a collective term from futures studies for analyzing future technology and its consequences. It includes technology intelligence, technology forecasting, technology roadmapping, technology assessment, and technology foresight. Technology Futures Analysis or Technology Future Analysis (TFA) is a synonym.

Future-oriented technology analysis shares common methods with horizon scanning.

== Definitions ==
Year	Definition
2004	Technology futures analysis is "any process to produce judgments about emerging technology characteristics, development pathways, and potential impacts of a technology in the future. ... [TFA] encompasses the broad technology foresight and assessment studies of the public sector and the technology forecasting and intelligence studies in private industry."
2013	Future-oriented technology analysis is "an umbrella term to denote several decision-preparatory tools - (technology) foresight, forecasting and technology assessment - and thus it is not a discipline with solid, widely accepted theoretical foundations."

== Methods ==
Methods and their families
Method	Family
Agent based modeling	Modeling and simulation
Analytical hierarchy process	Valuing/decision/economic
Backcasting	Descriptive and matrices
Bibliometrics	Monitoring and intelligence, Statistics
Brainstorming	Creativity
Cross impact analysis	Modeling and simulation, Statistics
Delphi	Expert Opinion
Multicriteria decision analyses	Valuing/decision/economic
Relevance tree	Descriptive and matrices, Valuing/decision/economic
Risk analysis	Descriptive and matrices, Valuing/decision/economic
Roadmapping	Descriptive and matrices
Scenarios	Scenarios
Social impact assessment	Descriptive and matrices
Stakeholder analysis	Descriptive and matrices, Valuing/decision/economic
Sustainability analysis	Descriptive and matrices, Modeling and simulation
System dynamics	Modeling and simulation
Technology assessment	Descriptive and matrices, Modeling and simulation
TRIZ	Creativity
