= Lessons learned =

Experiences distilled from past activities

Lessons learned (American English) or lessons learnt (British English) are experiences distilled from past activities that should be actively taken into account in future actions and behaviors.

== Definition ==
There are several definitions of the concept. The one used by the National Aeronautics and Space Administration (NASA), European Space Agency (ESA) and Japan Aerospace Exploration Agency (JAXA) reads as follows:

“A lesson learned is knowledge or understanding gained by experience. The experience may be positive, as in a successful test or mission, or negative, as in a mishap or failure...A lesson must be significant in that it has a real or assumed impact on operations; valid in that is factually and technically correct; and applicable in that it identifies a specific design, process, or decision that reduces or eliminates the potential for failures and mishaps, or reinforces a positive result.”

The Development Assistance Committee of the Organisation for Economic Co-operation and Development (OECD) defines lessons learned as:

“Generalizations based on evaluation experiences with projects, programs, or policies that abstract from the specific circumstances to broader situations. Frequently, lessons highlight strengths or weaknesses in preparation, design, and implementation that affect performance, outcome, and impact.”

The Project Management Institute (PMI) defines lessons learned as:

“the knowledge gained during a project, which shows how project events were addressed or should be addressed in the future, for the purpose of improving future performance.”

== Application ==
In the practice of the United Nations (UN) the concept has been made explicit in the name of their Working Group on Lessons Learned of the Peacebuilding Commission.

U.S. Army Center for Army Lessons Learned (CALL) since 1985 covers in detail the Army Lessons Learned Program and identifies, collects, analyzes, disseminates, and archives lessons and best practices.

In the military field, conducting a Lessons learned analysis requires a leader-led after-actions debriefing. These debriefings require the leader to extend the lessons-learned orientation of the standard after-action review. He uses the event reconstruction approach or has the individuals present their own roles and perceptions of the event, whichever best fits the situation and time available.

== See also ==
- After-action review
  - After action report
  - Debriefing
  - Hotwash
  - Postmortem documentation
  - Retrospective
- Benchmarking
- Best practice
- Business rule
- Experience curve
- Organizational learning
- Pre-assessment
- Risk management
- Strategic management
