= Retrospective =

Look back at events that took place before

A retrospective (from Latin retrospectare, "look back"), generally, is a look back at events that took place, or works that were produced, in the past. As a noun, retrospective has specific meanings in software development, popular culture, and the arts. It is applied as an adjective, synonymous with the term retroactive, to laws, standards, and awards.

== Arts and popular culture ==
Film retrospectives are usually screenings of films grouped around a theme or a particular director. They are mounted as part of many film festivals, including the Retrospective section in the Berlin International Film Festival, Sundance, Locarno Film Festival, Byron Bay Film Festival. They are also held by cinemas or various types of organisations. The Lincoln Center in New York City has held many film retrospectives in the form of screenings as well as podcasts.

A retrospective art exhibition is an art exhibition of visual art that presents works from an extended period of an artist's activity.

A retrospective compilation album is assembled from a recording artist's past material, often their greatest hits. Often the word is included in the title, such as Retrospective: The Best of Buffalo Springfield, released after the band's breakup in 1969, and Retrospective, a 1978 album of songs by Australian singer-songwriter Russell Morris.

A television or newsstand special about an actor, politician, or other celebrity will present a retrospective of the subject's career highlights. A leading (usually elderly) academic may be honored with a Festschrift, an honorary book of articles or a lecture series relating topically to a retrospective of the honoree's career. Celebrity roasts good-naturedly mock the career of the guest of honor, often in a retrospective format.

== Awards ==
A retrospective or retroactive award is one which is created and then awarded to persons who would have received it at a time when the awards were not given, such as the 1945 Retrospective Hugo Awards for science fiction.

== Law ==
The term is used in situations where the law (statutory, civil, or regulatory) is changed or reinterpreted, affecting acts committed before the alteration. When such changes make a previously committed lawful act now unlawful in a retroactive manner, this is known as an ex post facto law or retroactive law. Because such laws punish the accused for acts that were not unlawful when committed, they are rare, and not permissible in most legal systems.

Conversely, a form of retrospective law commonly called an amnesty law may decriminalize certain acts. A pardon has a similar effect, in a specific case instead of a class of cases. An in mitius change may alleviate possible consequences for unlawful acts (for example, by replacing the death sentence with lifelong imprisonment) retroactively. Finally, when a previous law is repealed or otherwise nullified, it is no longer applicable to situations to which it had been, even if such situations arose before the law was voided; this principle is known as nullum crimen, nulla poena sine praevia lege poenali.

== Software development ==
The term is also used in software engineering, where a retrospective is a meeting held by a project team at the end of a project or process (often after an iteration) to discuss what was successful about the project or time period covered by that retrospective, what could be improved, and how to incorporate the successes and improvements in future iterations or projects. In agile development, retrospectives play a very important role in iterative and incremental development. At the end of every iteration, a retrospective is held to look for ways to improve the process for the next iteration.

== Standards ==
In the context of scientific and technical standards, retrospectivity applies current norms to material that pre-dates new rules. An example of a retrospective or retroactive standard is the International Code of Zoological Nomenclature (ICZN Code), a convention which governs the formal scientific naming of animals, of which the 4th edition is effective since 2000. All previous editions of the ICZN Code, or previous other rules and conventions, are disregarded today, and the scientific names published in former times are to be evaluated only under the present edition of the ICZN Code.

== See also ==
- After action report
- After-action review
- Debriefing
- Lessons learned
- Morbidity and mortality conference
- Performance appraisal
- Retrospective cohort study
