= The 2028 Global Intelligence Crisis =

Report on the impact of artificial intelligence on humanity's future

Cover of the report

The 2028 Global Intelligence Crisis is a report authored by James van Geelen and Alap Shah and published by Citrini Research in February 2026, on the impact of artificial intelligence on humanity's future. Written in the form of a scenario analysis, it was viewed millions of times online and reportedly caused a fall in the stock market prices of major tech and financial firms. It also received criticism among others, for its allegedly flawed economic logic.

== Scenario of growing output and decreasing consumer spending ==
The 'thought exercise', as the authors called it, painted a gloomy picture for the near future, where outputs keep growing while consumer's ability to spend collapses. "...driven by ai agents that don’t sleep, take sick days or require health insurance”, "outputs that are shown in national accounts increases, "but never circulates through the real economy"(which the report calls 'Ghost GDP'), the authors argued. In other words, the authors predict a scenario where the owners of the AI firms will accumulate a vast fortune but there will be scant demand from consumers as AI would cause massive unemployment.

The authors caution the reader that what they make is a scenario and not a prediction. In the scenario they visualise, any service whose value proposition is “I will navigate complexity that you find tedious” is getting disrupted. The reports argues that the unique ability of human beings to analyse, decide, create, persuade, and coordinate was “the thing that could not be replicated at scale,” and call the historical scarcity of this precious entity 'friction'. When this friction becomes zero, a gamut of changes occur which then triggers a cascading of changes across the economy.

== Casualties of the scenario ==
”Travel booking platforms are an early casualty; Financial advice. tax prep., and routine legal work follow suit. National unemployment rate go as high 10.2% and the S&P 500 goes for a massive 38% peak-to-trough crash. In contrast to the previous technological revolutions the high-earning professionals suffers more and get forced to take up roles in the gig economy. Labour supply becomes abundant and this cuts wages all across the economy. The dent in income for the employees then affects other sectors of the economy such as the residential mortgage market. The losses for the software companies triggers loan defaults and heralds peril for the private credit sector.
