= InnovationXchange =

Open innovation intermediary based in Birmingham, England

The InnovationXchange, also known as IXC UK, is a Lincoln, UK-based open innovation services and consulting provider, whose purpose is to identify and create collaborative business, research and policy opportunities.

== History ==
The InnovationXchange was founded in 2003, with a business model based on the works of John Wolpert (formerly of IBM's Alpha Works and Extreme Blue) and Henry Chesbrough.

Originally known as the Australian Industry InnovationXchange Network, its aim was to provide an open network for improved communication across industry, government, universities and the community.

In 2004 the InnovationXchange (IXC) undertook a pilot with John Wolpert to test the concept of using 'trusted intermediaries' i.e. facilitating confidential exchange of sensitive information.

The pilot demonstrated that often organisations do not understand why external parties might value their capabilities. Further, they may not have assessed their capabilities and/or considered partnerships. This pilot was supported by the Commonwealth and Victorian governments.

This pilot was deemed a success and in 2006, the University of Birmingham licensed the InnovationXchange model in the UK.

As a publicly available example of the services IXC provide (as most work is highly confidential), in 2010 the company 'matched' Jaguar Land Rover with Bladon Jets, innovators of micro gas turbines.

In 2018 the company had a change of ownership and the business moved its head-office location from Birmingham to Lincoln.

== Operation ==
The IXC "trusted intermediary" model operated via a legal and ethical framework to enable organisations to connect with external sources of knowledge, ideas or technologies, or markets for business development, whilst protecting their Intellectual Property (IP). In practice this entailed an IXC Intermediary being embedded into an organisation and acting as both an internal and external innovation connector. Internally, the intermediary provided advice and guidance on structure and process development, helped connect sources of information and facilitated the sharing of knowledge. Externally, the intermediary identified potential solutions (technologies, materials etc.) and partners to address internally identified needs. This model operated in the UK until approximately 2017. Alongside the Intermediary service IXC developed a broad range of innovation services including technology scouting, horizon scanning, training, and partner searching which continue to be provided.

Subsequent to the 2018 change of ownership the focus of operations shifted with the decision to develop a digital platform. The Flo.How platform, launched in 2021, provides innovation tools and guidance for SME businesses and business advisers which engage with such businesses. This is a significant diversification from the original business model.
