= Paul J. H. Schoemaker =

Dutch decision theorist (born 1949)

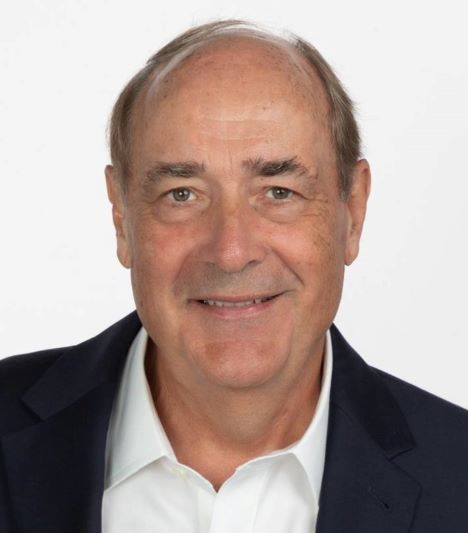
- Born: 4 April 1949 (age 77); Deventer, Netherlands
- Known for: Academic, author, and leader in the fields of Scenario planning, strategic management and decision making
- Spouse: Joyce Schoemaker
- Children: 2

Academic background
- Education: University of Groningen; University of Notre Dame; The Wharton School
- Thesis: Experimental studies on individual decision making under risk: An information processing approach (1977)
- Doctoral advisor: Howard Kunreuther
- Website: www.paulschoemaker.com

Paul Johannes Hubertus Schoemaker (born 1949) is an academic, author, and an expert in the fields of strategic management and decision making.

He is listed among the most highly cited scholars globally (top 1%) as measured by academic publications in leading journals of business and economics.

Schoemaker was the founder and executive chairman of a consulting and training firm specializing in strategic management, Decision Strategies International and also the chairman of two family companies (Public Salt Inc in Ohio and Vaessen-Schoemaker BV in the Netherlands). He also served on the board of the Decision Education Foundation, a philanthropic organization aimed at improving the decision making and judgment skills of adolescents, in associations with high schools around United States.

== Early life and education ==
He was born and raised in the Netherlands, and he started his studies in physics and mathematics at the University of Groningen, Netherlands. He graduated magna cum laude from the University of Notre Dame with a B.S. in physics in 1972. Later, he received an M.B.A. in Finance, an M.A. in Management and a Ph.D. in Decision Sciences, all three degrees from the Wharton School at the University of Pennsylvania. His PhD thesis was supervised by Howard Kunreuther and the extended thesis was later published as a book.

== Professional life ==
In 1975, he started his professional life as a Lecturer of Management at the Wharton School and later in 1977 served there as an assistant Professor of Management. For over twelve years (starting 1979), he served as a full-time professor in the Graduate School of Business at the University of Chicago, specializing in strategy and decision sciences. During 1982-84 he took an extended sabbatical with the strategic planning group of Royal Dutch Shell in London, where he helped pioneer scenario planning. Prof. Schoemaker has served as Research Director of the Mack Institute for Innovation Management at the Wharton School of the University of Pennsylvania, where he remains as a senior fellow.

He was also the founder and Executive Chairman of Decision Strategies International, a consulting and training firm specializing in strategic management, executive development and multi-media software. The company had of offices in the US and Europe, and was sold in 2016 to Heidrick and Struggles.

Paul Schoemaker has been an active private investor in new technology-based ventures and served on the board of directors of the Decision Education Foundation, a philanthropic organization aimed at improving the decision making and judgment skills of adolescents, in associations with high schools around United States.

== Personal life ==
He lives with his wife Joyce in on the east coast of the USA; they have two children. His hobbies include tennis, golf and piano.

His brother Hubert Schoemaker was a co-founder and the president of the biotech company Centocor.

== Publications ==
Schoemaker’s articles have appeared in the Harvard Business Review, The Journal of Economic Literature and the Journal of Mathematical Psychology, as well as numerous other journals. A selection of articles and books can be found below:

- Books (author)
  - Schoemaker, P. J. H. (1980). Experiments on Decisions under Risk. Dordrecht: Springer Netherlands. ISBN 978-94-017-5040-0.
  - J. Edward Russo, Paul J.H. Schoemaker (1990); Decision Traps; Simon & Schuster; ISBN 9780671726096
  - Russo, J. E.; Schoemaker, Paul J. (1991). Confident decision-making: how to make the right decision every time. London: Piatkus. ISBN 978-0-7499-1034-1.
  - Paul R. Kleindorfer, Howard C. Kunreuther, Paul J.H. Schoemaker (1993); Decision Sciences; Cambridge University Press; ISBN 9780521328678
  - George S. Day, Paul J. H. Schoemaker, Robert E. Gunther (2000); Wharton On Managing Emerging Technologies; Wiley; ISBN 9780471361213
  - J. Edward Russo, Paul J.H. Schoemaker (2001); Winning Decisions; Crown Business; ISBN 9780385502252
  - Paul J.H. Schoemaker, Robert E. Gunther (2002); Profiting from Uncertainty; Simon & Schuster; ISBN 9780743223287
  - George S. Day, Paul J.H. Schoemaker (2006); Peripheral Vision; Harvard Business School Press; ISBN 9781422101544
  - Paul J.H. Schoemaker, Joyce A. Schoemaker (2009); Chips, Clones and Living Beyond Hundred; FT Press; ISBN 9780137153855
  - Schoemaker, Paul J.H. (2011). Brilliant Mistakes: Finding Success on the Far Side of Failure. Wharton Digital Press. ISBN 9781613630112.
  - Krupp, Steven; Schoemaker, Paul J. H.; Teece, David J. (2014). Winning the long game: how strategic leaders shape the future. New York: Public Affairs. ISBN 978-1-61039-447-5.
  - Day, George S. and Schoemaker, Paul J.H., See Sooner–Act Faster: How Vigilant Leaders Thrive in an Era of Digital Turbulence, MIT Press, 2019.
  - Schoemaker, Paul J.H., Advanced Introduction to Scenario Planning, Edward Elgar Publishing, UK, 2022
  - J. H. Schoemaker, Paul (2025). Strategic Thinking and Decision Making: Varied Selections from My Column at Inc. com. La Vergne: Anthem Press. ISBN 978-1-83999-292-6.
- Articles
  - Paul J.H. Schoemaker (November 1995); Scenario Planning: "A Tool for Strategic Thinking”, Sloan Management Review
  - George S. Day, Paul J.H. Schoemaker (November 2005); Scanning the Periphery; Harvard Business Review
  - Paul J.H. Schoemaker, Robert E. Gunther (June 2006); The Wisdom of Deliberate Mistakes; Harvard Business Review
  - Paul J.H. Schoemaker (March 2012); 6 Habits of True Strategic Thinkers; Inc.com
  - Schoemaker, P.J.H., Steve Krupp and Samantha Howland, “Strategic Leadership: The Essential Skills” Harvard Business Review, Jan/Feb 2013, 131-134
  - Paul J.H. Schoemaker (April 2012); Why Failure Is the Foundation of Innovation; Inc.com
  - Schoemaker, Paul J.H and Philip E. Tetlock “Superforecasting: How to Upgrade Your Company’s Judgment,” Harvard Business Review, May 2016, pp 72–78
  - Schoemaker, Paul J.H., Sohvi Heaton, and David Teece “Innovation, Dynamic Capabilities and Leadership,” California Management Review, 2018, Vol. 61(1) pp 15–42.
  - Paul J.H. Schoemaker and George S. Day, “Preparing Organizations for Greater Turbulence,” California Management Review, Summer 2021, Vol 63, Issue 4
