= Technology scouting =

Element of technology management

Technology scouting is an element of technology management in which

(1) emerging technologies are identified,
(2) technology related information is channeled into an organization, and
(3) supports the acquisition of technologies.

It is a starting point of a long term and interactive matching process between external technologies and internal requirements of an existing organization for strategic purposes. This matching may also be aided by technology roadmapping. Technology scouting is also known to be part of competitive intelligence, which firms apply as a tool of competitive strategy. It can also be regarded as a method of technology forecasting or in the broader context also an element of corporate foresight. Technology scouting may also be applied as an element of an open innovation approach. Technology scouting is seen as an essential element of a modern technology management system.

The technology scout is either an employee of the company or an external consultant who engages in boundary spanning processes to tap into novel knowledge and span internal boundaries. They may be assigned part-time or full-time to the scouting task. The desired characteristics of a technology scout are similar to the characteristics associated with the technological gatekeeper. These characteristics include being a lateral thinker, knowledgeable in science and technology, respected inside the company, cross-disciplinary oriented, and imaginative personality. Technology scouts would also often play a vital role in a formalised technology foresight process.

== Case studies ==
Documented case studies include:

Organization	Project	Year
DZSF	"DZSF - Projekte - Voruntersuchung zu Gestaltung und Betrieb eines teilautomatisierten Technologiescouting-Systems"	2022
Deutsche Telekom	"Technology Scouting - a Case Study on the Deutsche Telekom Laboratories"	2007
Phonak	"Technology intelligence systems: practices and models for large, medium-sized and start-up companies"	2006
Novartis	"Organisation der Technology intelligence : eine empirische Untersuchung der Technologiefrühaufklärung in technologieintensiven Grossunternehmen"	2002
Elf Aquitaine	"Science and Technology Scouting at Elf Aquitaine"	1993

== See also ==
- Corporate Foresight
- Foresight (futures studies)
- Futurology
- Horizon scanning
- Scientific lacuna
- Strategic foresight
- Technology Management

== Scientific Journals ==
- Technological Forecasting and Social Change
- Futures
- Futures & Foresight Science
- Foresight
- Journal of Futures Studies
