= IXC =

IXC may refer to:

- InnovationXchange, a UK innovation management consultancy
- Interexchange carrier, a long-distance telephone company
- Chandigarh Airport (IATA code: IXC), a customs airport in Chandigarh, India
- IXC submarine, a Second World War era German submarine
- Ixcatec language (ISO code: IXC)
