= Technology management =

Design and control of technology products

Technology management refers to the integrated planning, design, optimization, operation and control of technological products, processes and services, in order to manage of the use of technology for human advantage. It contains a number of management disciplines that allow organizations to manage their technological fundamentals to benefit their customers. The role of the technology management function in an organization is to understand the value of certain technology for the organization and for the customer, and to identify when it is better to invest in technology development and when to withdraw.

== Key concepts ==
Typical concepts used in technology management are:

- Technology strategy - the logic or role of technology in an organization.
- Technology forecasting - the identification of possible relevant technologies for the organization, such as technology scouting.
- Technology roadmap - mapping technologies to business and market needs.
- Technology project portfolio (a set of projects under development) and technology portfolio (a set of technologies in use).
- Technology transfer - the process by which technology is transferred from the institution, organization or person that possesses it to another institution, organization or person, usually with the aim of transforming inventions and scientific knowledge into novel products and services that can then be provided to the market place or society in general.

== Accreditation and certification ==
=== United States ===
In the United States, Technology Management was deemed an emerging field of study by the Department of Education and received a new Classification of Instructional Program (CIP) code in 2020. The Association of Technology, Management, and Applied Engineering (ATMAE) accredits collegiate programs in technology management. An instructor or graduate of a technology management program may choose to become a Certified Technology Manager (CTM) by sitting an exam administered by ATMAE covering production planning & control, safety, quality, and management/supervision. The ATMAE program accreditation is recognized by the Council for Higher Education Accreditation (CHEA) for accrediting associate, baccalaureate, and master's degree technology management programs.

=== The Netherlands and Germany ===
Technology management is taught in bachelors and masters programs at technical and non-technical universities including: University of Groningen, TU Delft, University of Amsterdam and University of Stuttgart.

Technology management is also taught in the form of applied science, such as at Hochschule Deggendorf and CBS Stuttgart.

== See also ==
- Innovation management
