= TFA =

TFA may refer to:

== Sciences ==
=== Chemistry ===
- Trifluoroacetic acid, a strong carboxylic acid
- Trifluoroacetone, a chemical compound
- Trans fatty acid

=== Physics ===
- Time–frequency analysis, a signal processing approach utilizing both time and frequency components of a signal

=== Computer science ===
- Two-factor authentication, an approach to verify identity in computer security

== Culture ==
- Thai Film Archive
- Star Wars: The Force Awakens

== Economy ==
- The Freedom Association, a free-market libertarian advocacy group in the United Kingdom
- Trade Facilitation Agreement, part of the 2013 WTO Bali Package
- Taxpayer First Act, an IRS reform law

== Sports ==
- Taipei Football Association
- Tata Football Academy, a football (soccer) organisation in India
- Terengganu FA, a Malaysian football club

== Various ==
- Task Force Argos, responsible for investigation of online child exploitation and abuse
- Teach For America, an organization to recruit teachers for public schools
- Technology Futures Analysis, a collective term from futures studies
- Texas Forensic Association, an organization that provides speech and debate competitions for school students
