= Horizon scanning =

Methodology in futures studies

Horizon scanning (HS) or horizon scan is a method from futures studies, sometimes regarded as a part of foresight. It is the early detection and assessment of emerging technologies or threats for mainly policy makers in a domain of choice. Such domains include agriculture, environmental studies, health care, biosecurity, and food safety.

Some sources mention HS as an alternative name for environmental scanning (ES), or view HS as a subset of ES, or at least suggest ES to have a similar goal to HS. In summary, ES has key differences to HS. ES is rather concerned to provide industry specific information for short-term decision making in a competitive environment.

== Etymology ==
One of the first usages of the term horizon scanning as related to futures studies appeared in 1995 in a paper discussing trends in information technology and forecasting the year 2005. Then, horizon scanning was used to name detection and early evaluation of health care technologies in a European workshop in September 1997, whose participants were 27 policy makers and researchers from 12 countries. This workshop was organized as a part of the European health technology assessment project (HTA). Policy makers and planners of health services were the main target groups for knowledge produced by horizon scanning.

Definitions of Horizon Scanning
Year	Source	Definition
2002	Department for Environment, Food and Rural Affairs	Horizon scanning is "the systematic examination of potential threats, opportunities and likely future developments which are at the margins of current thinking and planning’ and, continuing, horizon scanning ‘may explore novel and unexpected issues, as well as persistent problems or trends."
2004	UK Government's Chief Scientific Advisor's Committee	"Horizon scanning is the systematic examination of potential threats, opportunities and likely future developments including – but not restricted to – those that are at the margins of current thinking and planning. Horizon scanning may explore novel and unexpected issues, as well as persistent problems or trends."
2015	Report by Fraunhofer Institute for Systems and Innovation Research ISI, Netherlands Organisation for Applied Scientific Research and VTT Technical Research Centre of Finland for the European Commission	"Horizon Scanning is the systematic outlook to detect early signs of potentially important developments. These can be weak (or early) signals, trends, wild cards or other developments, persistent problems, risks and threats, including matters at the margins of current thinking that challenge past assumptions."
2019	OECD	Horizon scanning is "a technique for detecting early signs of potentially important developments through a systematic examination of potential threats and opportunities, with emphasis on new technology and its effects on the issue at hand."

== Phases and techniques ==
A 2013 systematic study of 23 formally established health technology HS programs from different countries identified following common phases in a horizon scanning process:

- Identify the users of the HS products.
- Estimate the time available for the HS effort.
- Conduct HS, and identify emerging technologies that potentially affect targeted domain.
- Filter the identified technologies by applying criteria for determining the relevance of the technologies to the HS effort.
- Prioritize the technologies that have passed through the filtering process by applying criteria based on stakeholders’ requirements and needs.
- Assess technologies of high priority for the stakeholders, and predict their potential impacts targeted domain.
- Use peer review to check for quality of the HS process and products.
- Disseminate the HS products to the relevant audiences in a timely fashion.
- Update the HS products on a regular basis or when a significant development occurs related to the technology.

Horizon scanning shares common methods with future-oriented technology analysis. Horizon scanning includes following techniques:

Technique	Example
Interviews	Environmental Research Funders Forum Horizon Scanning Study
Issue tree	Foresight project on Brain Science, Addiction and Drugs
Literature searches and state-of-science reviews	Medical Technology Horizon Scanning
Expert workshops	Horizon scan of conservation issues in UK. Assessment of 100 ecological questions of highest priority to global conservation.
Open fora	Future Wiki
Delphi questionnaire	50 key issues for the future of Mediterranean wetlands
Trend analysis	HSTOOL – semiautomatic discovery of scientific trends from clusters of publications
Scenarios	Wildlife Conservation Societies’ Futures of the Wild
Systems/Maps	Foresight project on Tackling Obesities: Future Choices
Backcasting	

== Governmental bodies ==
=== European Union ===
European Commission developed the Transport Research and Innovation Monitoring and Information System (TRIMIS) in 2017, an open-access transport information system supporting the implementation of the seven Strategic Transport Research and Innovation Agenda (STRIA) roadmaps. In 2021, a horizon scanning module was added to TRIMIS. This horizon scanning framework developed by Joint Research Centre within TRIMIS uses news media, scientific publication sources, patent data sources, EU funding datasets and other sources as basis for text mining.

Joint Research Centre's "Tool for Innovation Monitoring" augments horizon scanning with text mining of available literature. This tool is developed in 2020. Among the used data sources are Scopus, PATSTAT and Cordis.

=== Germany ===
Umweltbundesamt applies horizon scanning since 2012 along with trend analysis.

=== Russia ===
In the Russian Federation, horizon scanning is performed by Higher School of Economics and financed by Ministry of Education and Science. In 2012, Putin stated that "[a] Foresight exercise for Russia’s science and technology towards 2030 is due to be completed. It highlights specific ways to both revitalize traditional sectors and penetrate into new high-tech markets…". Russian horizon scanning team consisted of 15–20 members and conducted an online survey of 2000 experts.

=== Sweden ===
Swedish Defence Research Agency has developed a software tool named HSTOOL for HS of scientific literature in 2019. The scientific literature is searched, clustered in groups that correspond to subject subfields and evaluated based on the bibliometric numbers. The clustering is performed using Gibbs sampling Dirichlet multinomial mixture model algorithm. The citation statistics are provided derived from Thomson Reuters' Web of Science.

=== UK ===
In order to centralize horizon scanning, UK has founded the English Horizon Scanning Centre (HSC) in 2005. The Cabinet Office's Horizon Scanning Secretariat and the Government Office for Science's Horizon Scanning Centre were combined to the Horizon Scanning Programme team in 2014.

=== USA ===
In 2010, The Agency for Healthcare Research and Quality (AHRQ) established the first publicly funded Healthcare Horizon Scanning program of the US. Currently, since 2018, Patient-Centered Outcomes Research Institute (PCORI) funds and operates the publicly available PCORI Health Care Horizon Scanning System (HCHSS).

== See also ==
- Futurology
- Risk analysis
- Scientific lacuna
- Technology assessment
- Technology scouting
- William J. Sutherland
- Jonathan Brill
