= Postmortem documentation =

Process in project management

A project post-mortem is a process used to identify the causes of a project failure (or significant business-impairing downtime), and how to prevent them in the future. This is different from a Retrospective, in which both positive and negative things are reviewed for a project.

The Project Management Body of Knowledge (PMBOK) refers to the process as lessons learned. Project post-mortems are intended to inform process improvements which mitigate future risks and to promote iterative best practices. Post-mortems are often considered a key component of, and ongoing precursor to, effective risk management.

== Elements of a project post-mortem ==
Post-mortems can encompass both quantitative data and qualitative data. Quantitative data include the variance between the hours estimated for a project and the actual hours incurred. Qualitative data will often include stakeholder satisfaction, end-user satisfaction, team satisfaction, potential reusability and perceived quality of end-deliverables.

== Role of time tracking ==
Successful analysis of project estimate variance is dependent on accurate time tracking. The greater the granularity with which time is tracked, the more detailed an analysis can be performed during the project post-mortem.

== See also ==
- Kickoff meeting
- Pre-mortem
- Project management
- Risk management
- Retrospective § Software development
