= Strategic technology plan =

A strategic technology plan is a specific type of strategy plan that lets an organization know where it is now and where its wants to be some time in the future with regard to the technology and infrastructure in the organization. It often consists of the following sections.

== Components of strategic technology plan ==
=== Mission, vision statement ===
A mission statement describes the overall purpose of the organization.

An example of a mission statement:

Our mission is to ensure our students have the desire for learning and provide them with the knowledge, skills, and values to become contributing citizens of the world.

A vision statement describes what the organization stands for, what it believes in, and why it exists. It describes the desired outcome, invoking a vivid mental picture of the company's goal.

An example of a vision statement:

The Carrington Public School System is committed to seeing students exercising self-control, being accountable, showing respect, actively learning, inquiring, discussing, questioning, debating, self-motivated, creating, connecting instruction to life, and reflecting and revising.

=== Needs assessment ===
A needs assessment is a systematic exploration of the way things are and the way they should be. These things are usually associated with organizational and/or individual performance.

A needs assessment describes: teaching and learning, integration of technology with business requirements, curricula and instruction, educator preparation and development, administration and support services, infrastructure for technology.

Curriculum integration

When evaluating your needs, consider:

- Current curriculum strengths and weaknesses and the process used to determine these strengths and weaknesses
- How curriculum strategies are aligned to state standards
- Current procedures for using technology to address any perceived curriculum weaknesses
- How teachers integrate technology into their lessons
- How students use technology

Professional development

When evaluating your needs, consider:

- How the organization assesses the technology professional development needs of certified staff, administration, and non-certified staff
- Technology professional development training available to certified staff
- How the effectiveness of the professional development will be measured.

Equitable use of technology

When evaluating your needs, consider:

- Availability of technology to students, staff, employees, and organization members
- Amount of time technology is available to students, staff, or organization members
- Description of types of assistive technology tools that are provided for students, employees or users with disabilities where necessary/applicable.

Infrastructure for technology

When evaluating your needs, consider:

- Current technology infrastructure of the school/organization - explain the type of data and video networking and Internet access that is available
- Effectiveness of present infrastructure and telecommunication service provided
- How E-Rate has allowed the district to improve or increase technology infrastructure.

Administrative needs

When evaluating your needs, consider:

- How administrative staff uses technology, accessing data for decision making, information system reporting, communication tools, information gathering, and record-keeping
- Professional development opportunities that are available to administrative staff.

Stakeholders are composed of;

- Board members
- People affected by technology
- Superintendent
- Principals/assistants
- Teachers/special needs teachers
- Parents/students/community members
- Director of Technology
- Director of Instructional Technology
- Teaching and learning design team

=== Technology initiative descriptions, goal statement and rationale ===
In order for technology to be effective, it must be tied to leadership, core visions, professional development, time, and assessment. The following goals are statements of ways with regard to its use of technology:

- To improve student academic performance through the integration of curriculum and technology
- Increase administrative uses of technology
- Utilize technology as a medium to create an interactive partnership between the system, parents, community agencies, industry, and business partners
- To utilize technology to support the professional growth of all staff, which will result in maximum learning to all students

=== Objectives (measurable and observable) ===
The objectives are tied to the mission and vision statements. Each goal has objectives and indicators. The objectives stated in specific and measurable terms what must be accomplished in order to reach the larger goal.

The Technology plan splits the objectives into categories:

- Teaching and learning
- Educator preparation and development
- Administration and support services
- Infrastructure for technology
- Integration of technology with curricula and instruction

=== Hardware, software, and facility resource requirement ===
Only by having the proper equipment can staff development take place. Effective technology plans should not just focus on the technology but also the applications. This will provide teachers and administrators with the information on what they should be able to do with the technology. Professional development is the most important element in implementing technology into the classroom. Teachers must be able to have strategies to change the way they teach and integrate new technology. The only way to do this is to provide the hardware, software and the training. Teachers and administrators should be able to use a variety of technology applications such as: the Internet, video cameras, iPods, and multimedia presentations.

=== Instructional resource requirement and staff development plan ===
In order for an organization to fulfill its mission and goals, it is important that all staff be provided with the necessary support and training opportunities to enable them to undertake their roles to the highest standard. The plan will provide training and educational opportunities for professional and personal development to relate to educational activities. Professional development is a key focus of the No Child Left Behind Act of 2001. The law requires enhancing education through technology entitlement funds to be directed toward professional development that is ongoing and high quality.

=== Itemized budget and rational, evaluation method, and funding ===
In the strategic plan, there is an item budget, evaluation method, and funding source/amount/timeline. The itemized budget is broken down into the years of the plan. Money is divided up into amounts that will be used for each year. The evaluation method collects data and disaggregates it to determine the outcomes.

== See also ==
- Information technology planning
- Technology life cycle
- Technology roadmap
