= Ernest Amory Codman =

American surgeon

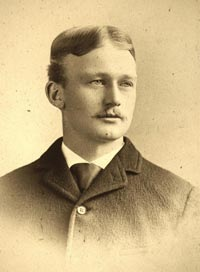
- Born: 30 December 1869; Boston, Massachusetts
- Died: 23 November 1940 (aged 70); Ponkapoag, Massachusetts
- Education: Harvard University
- Known for: Establishing end results based medical care.
- Scientific career
- Fields: Medicine, Surgery
- Workplaces: Massachusetts General Hospital; Harvard University

Ernest Amory Codman, M.D., (December 30, 1869 – November 23, 1940) was an American surgeon who made contributions to anaesthesiology, radiology, duodenal ulcer surgery, orthopaedic oncology, shoulder surgery, and the study of medical outcomes.

Codman was born in Boston Massachusetts. He attended the Fay School in Southborough, and prepped at St. Mark's School, matriculating at Harvard College.

He was an advocate of hospital reform and is the acknowledged founder of what today is known as outcomes management in patient care. Codman was the first American doctor to follow the progress of patients through their recoveries in a systematic manner. He kept track of his patients via "End Result Cards" which contained basic demographic data on every patient treated, along with the diagnosis, the treatment he rendered, and the outcome of each case. Each patient was followed up on for at least one year to observe long-term outcomes. It was his lifelong pursuit to establish an "end results system" to track the outcomes of patient treatments as an opportunity to identify clinical misadventures that serve as the foundation for improving the care of future patients. He also believed that all of this information should be made public so that patients could be guided in their choices of physicians and hospitals.

Codman graduated from Harvard Medical School in 1895 and interned at Massachusetts General Hospital. He joined the surgical staff of Massachusetts General and became a member of the Harvard faculty. While there, he instituted the first morbidity and mortality conferences. However, in 1914, the hospital refused his plan for evaluating surgeon competence, and he lost his staff privileges there. Dr. Codman eventually established his own hospital (which he called the "End Result Hospital") to pursue the performance measurement and improvement objectives he believed in so fervently. To support his "end results theory," Dr. Codman made public the end results of his own hospital in a privately published book, A Study in Hospital Efficiency. Of the 337 patients discharged between 1911 and 1916, Dr. Codman recorded and published 123 errors.

With an interest in health care quality, Dr. Codman also helped lead the founding of the American College of Surgeons and its Hospital Standardization Program. The latter entity eventually became the Joint Commission on Accreditation of Healthcare Organizations. He also established the first bone tumor registry in the United States, an idea which had first been suggested by the British physician Sir Thomas Percival in 1803.

Dr. Codman's name is also attached to "Codman's Exercises," a series of exercises for the purpose or regaining range of motion (see Physical therapy), and "Codman's Tumor," a benign tumor of the cartilage.

Dr. Codman married Katherine P. Bowditch on November 16, 1899.

Codman was also a public health pioneer, studying hospital outcomes to determine how they could be improved. Codman wrote, "We believe it is the duty of every hospital to establish a follow-up system, so that as far as possible the result of every case will be available at all times for investigation by members of the staff, the trustees, or administration, or by other authorized investigators or statisticians."

In 1996, in tribute to Ernest Codman, M.D., the Joint Commission published the book "Codman: A Study in Hospital Efficiency." The Commission also established the Ernest A. Codman Award for the use of outcomes measures to advance the quality and safety of patient care.

Dr. Codman was a self-described atheist and was known to provoke his peers with exaggeration and humor.
