= Pre-mortem =

Project strategy to lower risk by assuming failure and brainstorming possible causes

A pre-mortem, or premortem, is a managerial strategy in which a project team imagines that a project or organization has failed, and then works backward to determine what potentially could lead to the failure of the project or organization.

The technique breaks possible groupthinking by facilitating a positive discussion on threats, increasing the likelihood the main threats are identified. Management can then reduce the chances of failure due to heuristics and biases such as overconfidence and planning fallacy by analyzing the magnitude and likelihood of each threat, and take preventive actions to protect the project or organization from suffering an untimely "death". It formalizes and expands on the acknowledgedly much older concept of prospective hindsight (Mitchell, Russo, and Pennington 1989) in which participants "look back from the future" to identify problems before they occur. In their study, whether an outcome was presented as certain mattered more than whether it was set in the past or the future: explanations for events described as certain were longer and relied more on specific episodes.

According to a Harvard Business Review article from 2007, "unlike a typical critiquing session, in which project team members are asked what might go wrong, the premortem operates on the assumption that the 'patient' has died, and so asks what did go wrong."

The pre-mortem analysis seeks to identify threats and weaknesses via the hypothetical presumption of near-future failure. But if that presumption is incorrect, then the analysis may be identifying threats/weaknesses that are not in fact real.

== See also ==
- Kickoff meeting
- Postmortem documentation
- Worst-case scenario
