= J. Edward Russo =

American decision researcher

- Born: Joseph Edward Russo
- Known for: Decision Traps; Winning Decisions; predecisional information distortion

Academic background
- Education: California Institute of Technology (BS); University of Michigan (MS, PhD)

Academic work
- Discipline: Decision-making, consumer behavior
- Institutions: Cornell University

Joseph Edward Russo is an American behavioral scientist who studies how managers and consumers make decisions. He is the S.C. Johnson Family Professor of Management Emeritus at Cornell University's Samuel Curtis Johnson Graduate School of Management. With Paul J. H. Schoemaker he wrote the management books Decision Traps (1989) and Winning Decisions (2002).

== Education and career ==
Russo received a bachelor's degree in mathematics from the California Institute of Technology in 1963, and a master's degree in probability and statistics (1966) and a doctorate in cognitive psychology (1971) from the University of Michigan. He taught at the University of Chicago and the University of California, San Diego before joining Cornell, and he has held visiting positions at Bocconi University, Carnegie Mellon University, Duke University's Fuqua School of Business, the Indian School of Business and the Wharton School. In 2002 he was a professor of marketing and behavioral science at the Johnson School.

He is a fellow of the American Association for the Advancement of Science, the American Psychological Association and the Association for Psychological Science.

== Research ==
Russo's research concerns how people take in and use information while they decide. With Eric J. Johnson he studied how familiarity with a product category affects how consumers learn new information about products. With Johnson and Debra L. Stephens he examined the validity of verbal protocols, the method of asking people to think aloud as they work through a task.

In a 1989 study with Deborah J. Mitchell and Nancy Pennington, Russo examined "prospective hindsight", explaining a future event as if it had already happened.

With Victoria Husted Medvec and Margaret G. Meloy, he described predecisional information distortion: during a decision, people interpret new information so that it favors whichever option they already lean toward. In their 1996 experiment this distortion occurred both when a preference existed beforehand and when one developed during the decision, and it was larger than the distortion that follows a decision as people reduce cognitive dissonance.

== Books ==
Decision Traps: The Ten Barriers to Brilliant Decision-Making and How to Overcome Them (1989), written with Schoemaker, applied decision research to management, including how disasters such as the Challenger explosion might have been avoided through better decision-making.

Winning Decisions: Getting It Right the First Time (2002), also with Schoemaker, sets out a four-step process: framing the decision, gathering intelligence, coming to conclusions and learning from experience. Publishers Weekly called it a practical workbook that would be useful to managers at every level, and the Harvard Business Review described it as a "comprehensive, well-balanced guide" to decision-making. It was also reviewed in the Journal of Economic Psychology.

== Selected works ==
- Russo, J. Edward; Schoemaker, Paul J. H. (1989). Decision Traps: The Ten Barriers to Brilliant Decision-Making and How to Overcome Them. Doubleday. ISBN 0-385-24835-0.
- Russo, J. Edward; Schoemaker, Paul J. H. (1992). "Managing Overconfidence". Sloan Management Review. 33 (2): 7–17.
- Russo, J. Edward; Schoemaker, Paul J. H. (2002). Winning Decisions: Getting It Right the First Time. Doubleday Currency. ISBN 0-385-50225-7.

== See also ==
- Pre-mortem
