= Information technology planning =

Information Technology Planning (ITP) is a critical topic in the large field of information technology and information systems management. ITP's major goal is to streamline IT investment and decision-making planning procedures, resulting in a more flexible, adaptive, and tightly linked process. According to Architecture and Governance Magazine, ITP has matured into a full discipline inside the Strategic Planning domain, with enterprise architecture sitting alongside other competencies. This dynamic strategy ensures that the wheels of technology planning revolve quickly and efficiently, adjusting to the always changing IT world.

== Arguments in favor ==
It takes too long to adjust plans to meet business needs. By the time IT is prepared, opportunities have passed, and the plans become obsolete. IT lacks the means to understand how it currently supports the business strategy. The linkage between IT's capabilities - and their associated costs, benefits, and risks - and the business needs is not mapped out. Additionally, the process is hindered by information gathering and number crunching.

This creates plans that do not accurately reflect what IT will actually do or what the business truly needs. As a result, the business fails to understand how IT contributes to the execution of the strategy. It does not start planning with a clear picture of which demands are truly strategic or which actions will have the most significant impact. Information regarding business needs and the costs, benefits, and risks of IT capabilities comes from sources of varying quality. Consequently, IT makes planning decisions based on misleading information.

IT plans often end up inflexible and unverifiable. They lack contingencies to minimize the impact of change, and they have not been verified as the best course of action through comparison to alternatives and scenarios. IT simply does not have the time and information required for this process. Manual preparation of multiple plans and selection of the best one would be time-consuming for most organizations, especially considering the availability of the necessary information for comparison.

== Strategies for providing an information technology planning capability. ==
According to Forrester Research, there are several recognized strategies for providing an information technology planning capability.

A repository of application data. Planning tools provide a common inventory of application data including costs, life cycles, and owners, so that planners have easy access to the information that drives their decisions.

Capability maps. Forrester recommends using capability maps to link IT's capabilities to the critical business processes they support. These software tools provide a graphical tool that clearly outlines how the business capabilities that IT provides to the business are linked to IT’s efforts. This can also be known as an IT Road-map or technology roadmap.

Gap analysis tools. Alongside capability maps, planning tools capture information about the future state of business capabilities as dictated by the business strategy. Users utilize this functionality to identify areas where IT capabilities need to be built, enhanced, or scaled back, thereby driving IT's strategy.

Modeling and analytic capability. These tools enable planning teams to create various plans, which can then be compared to weigh the pros, cons, and risks of each. Additionally, their impact on architecture and current initiatives becomes visible. This ensures that plans remain relevant, provides teams with the foresight to plan holistically, and enables IT to communicate the plan.

Reporting tools. Reports guide the planning team's decisions, such as identifying applications with redundant capabilities, those that have not been upgraded, or those plagued with costly issues. This allows IT's strategic decisions to be easily justified. The management process is used in business policy, and each person is able to promote the policy of data feeds and understand how much process is involved in each management data process.

== Results ==
Companies like Barclays Bank, Accenture and Vodafone as well as Government agencies like Department of Homeland Security and Los Alamos National Laboratory, have made investments in strategic IT planning capabilities and returns on investment as great as 700% have been validated for these kinds of projects.

== See also ==
- Requirement prioritization
- Strategic management
- Strategic technology plan
- Technology roadmap
