= Foresight (futures studies) =

Term referring to various activities in futurology

In futurology, especially in Europe, the term foresight has become widely used to describe activities such as:

- critical thinking concerning long-term developments,
- debate,
- wider participatory democracy, and
- shaping the future, especially by influencing public policy.

In the last decade, scenario methods, for example, have become widely used in some European countries in policy-making. The FORSOCIETY network brings together national Foresight teams from most European countries, and the European Foresight Monitoring Project is collating material on Foresight activities around the world. Foresight methods are used more and more in regional planning and decision–making (“regional foresight”). Several non-European think tanks, like Strategic Foresight Group, also engage in foresight studies.

The foresight of futurology is also known as strategic foresight. This foresight used by and describing professional futurists trained in Master's programs is the research-driven practice of exploring expected and alternative futures and guiding futures to inform strategy. Foresight includes understanding the relevant recent past; scanning to collect insight about present, futuring to describe the understood future including trend research; environment research to explore possible trend breaks from developments on the fringe and other divergencies that may lead to alternative futures; visioning to define preferred future states; designing strategies to craft this future; and adapting the present forces to implement this plan. There is notable but not complete overlap between foresight and strategic planning, change management, forecasting, and design thinking.

At the same time, the use of foresight for companies (“corporate foresight”) is becoming more professional and widespread Corporate foresight is used to support strategic management, identify new business fields and increase the innovation capacity of a firm.

Foresight is not the same as futures research or strategic planning. It encompasses a range of approaches that combine the three components mentioned above, which may be recast as:

- futures (forecasting, forward thinking, prospectives),
- planning (strategic analysis, priority setting), and
- networking (participatory, dialogic) tools and orientations.

Much futurology research has been rather ivory tower work, but Foresight programmes were designed to influence policy - often R&D policy. Much technology policy had been very elitist; Foresight attempts to go beyond the "usual suspects" and gather widely distributed intelligence. These three lines of work were already common in Francophone futures studies going by the name la prospective. In the 1990s, an explosion of systematic organisation of these methods began in large-scale technology foresight programmes in Europe and elsewhere.

Foresight thus draws on traditions of work in long-range planning and strategic planning, horizontal policymaking and democratic planning, and participatory futurology - but was also highly influenced by systemic approaches to innovation studies, science and technology policy, and analysis of "critical technologies".

Many of the methods that are commonly associated with Foresight - Delphi surveys, scenario workshops, etc. - derive from futurology. So does the fact that Foresight is concerned with:

- The longer-term - futures that are usually at least 10 years away (though there are some exceptions to this, especially in its use in private business). Since Foresight is action-oriented (the planning link) it will rarely be oriented to perspectives beyond a few decades out (though where decisions like aircraft design, power station construction or other major infrastructural decisions are concerned, then the planning horizon may well be half a century).
- Alternative futures: it is helpful to examine alternative paths of development, not just what is currently believed to be most likely or business as usual. Often Foresight will construct multiple scenarios. These may be an interim step on the way to creating what may be known as positive visions, success scenarios, aspirational futures. Sometimes alternative scenarios will be a major part of the output of Foresight work, with the decision about what future to build being left to other mechanisms.

== See also ==
- Accelerating change
- Emerging technologies
- Foresight Institute
- Forecasting
- Horizon scanning
- Optimism bias
- Reference class forecasting
- Scenario planning
- Strategic foresight
- Strategic Foresight Group
- Technology forecasting
- Technology Scouting
