= After action report =

Retrospective analysis

An after action report (or AAR) is any form of retrospective analysis on a given sequence of goal-oriented actions previously undertaken, generally by the author themselves.

The two principal forms of AARs are the literary AAR, intended for recreational use, and the analytical AAR, exercised as part of a process of performance evaluation and improvement. In most cases, AARs are a combination of both. Most analytical AARs are conducted over a contemporary problem or situation that has occurred in the past, is happening right now, or what could happen in the future.

== History ==
The first AARs were developed by army generals. One of the first and best examples of an AAR is Julius Caesar’s “Commentaries on the Gallic War”.

Contemporary examples of AARs include project evaluations in business, as well as summaries of large gaming sessions in videogame culture.

== Literary AARs ==
Literary AARs can be formal or informal documents that seek syntax and linguistic improvement. Many research papers published under an academic journal can be considered a literary AAR. There might not be much of a difference between literary AARs and analytical AARs in terms of research papers, but the key difference is analytical seeks to improve performance while literary seeks to improve style.

== Analytical AARs ==
Analytical AARs are formal documents intended to serve as aids to performance evaluation and improvement, by registering situation–response interactions, analyzing critical procedures, determining their effectiveness and efficiency, and proposing adjustments and recommendations.

=== Objectives ===
Analytical AARs have three central objectives:

- Identifying problematic issues and needs for improvement
- Proposing measures to counteract problematic elements
- Obtaining “lessons learned”

=== Structure ===
1. Overview
2. Goals and objectives
3. Analysis of outcomes
4. Analysis of the performance shown on critical tasks
5. Summary
6. Recommendations

=== Examples ===
- The U.S. Army has adopted the After Action Review (AAR) as the primary method for delivering feedback after unit training exercises. Likewise, the U.S. Army Research Institute (ARI) has supported the development and implementation of AAR procedures for over 20 years. The After Action Review Process is critical to forming an After Action Report. Notes from the review often find themselves in the report.
- Another example of an After Action Report is the global status reported on road safety. Studies are conducted in order to determine how severe road safety concerns are in a particular area. After this, a report is created over the conditional event that is road safety, and a reflection is written with insight into how road safety can be improved.
- Exercise reports are a form of analytical AARs and could be peer-reviewed by an expert who might make suggestions to one's workout routine. Exercise reports find themselves following the same structure as a general AAR. A draft report can be written before workouts, and a follow-up report could be written afterward detailing steps the user could act upon in order to improve their work ethic. The exerciser looking at their own report would know what they need to improve upon in the future, and could practice that skill in order to perfect it.

== See also ==
- List of established military terms
- After action review
