= Howard Kunreuther =

American risk analyst (1938–2023)

- Kunreuther in 2008
- Born: Howard Charles Kunreuther; November 14, 1938
- Died: August 1, 2023 (aged 84)
- Education: Bates College (AB); Massachusetts Institute of Technology (PhD)
- Title: James G. Dinan Professor Emeritus of Decision Sciences and Public Policy

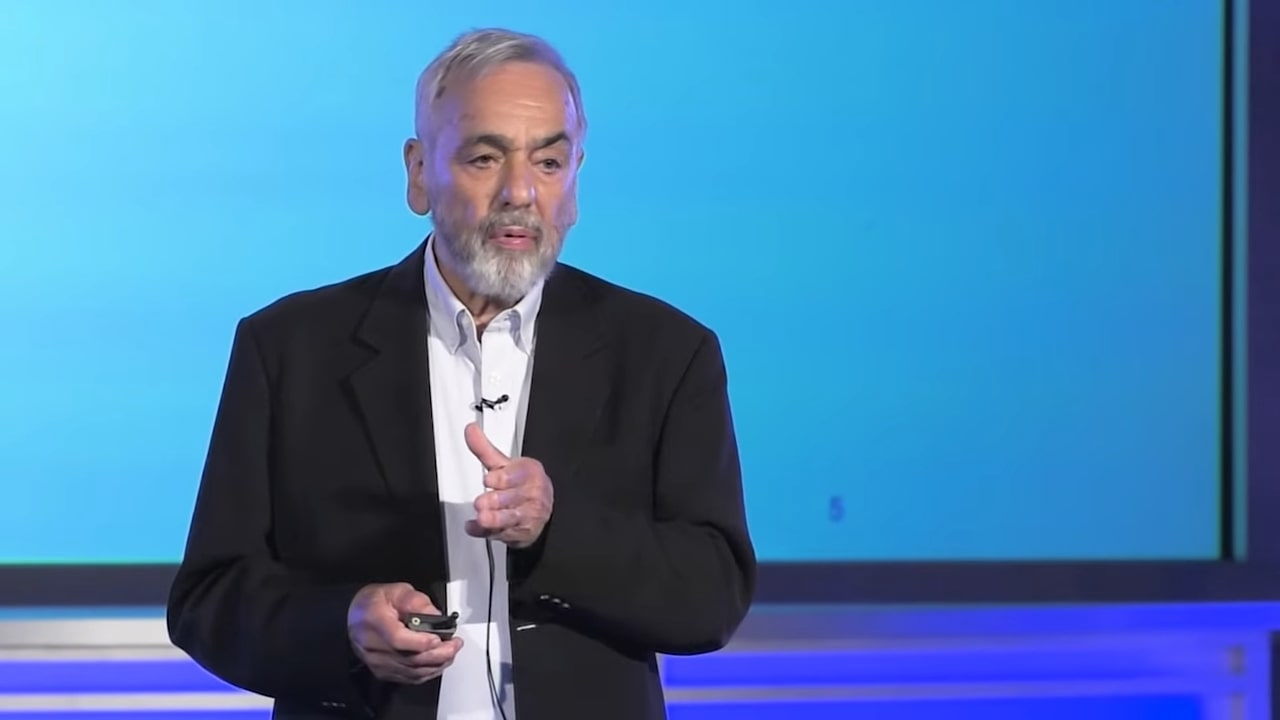
Kunreuther in 2020

Howard Charles Kunreuther (November 14, 1938 – August 1, 2023) was an American economist. He was the James G. Dinan professor emeritus of decision sciences and public policy at the Wharton School of the University of Pennsylvania.

== Background ==
Howard Charles Kunreuther received an A.B. in economics from Bates College, and a PhD in the same subject from the Massachusetts Institute of Technology. He was a fellow of the American Association for the Advancement of Science, and a distinguished fellow of the Society for Risk Analysis.

His research focuses on managing and financing losses due to technological and natural hazards such as high-level radioactive waste repositories, and extreme events such as climate change, terrorism, earthquakes, floods, and hurricanes.

Howard Kunreuther died on August 1, 2023, at the age of 84.

== Research ==
=== Interdependent Security ===
In an interdependent world, the risks faced by any one agent depend not only on its choices but also on those of others. One weak link in a system can cause large losses to others. An example is the bombing of Pan Am Flight 103 in 1988: the bomb was loaded onto a plane at a low-security airport in Malta and transferred to Pan Am 103 where it was set to explode when the plane was 25,000 feet in the air.

=== Guiding Principles for Insurance ===
- Insurance premiums should be based on risk in order to provide signals to individuals as to the hazards they face and to encourage them to engage in cost-effective mitigation measures to reduce their vulnerability to catastrophes.
- Affordability of insurance for low-income residents is an important concern if premiums rise to a level that low-income residents cannot afford. Kunreuther has proposed a mechanism whereby low-income homeowners could receive a voucher to cover the costs of protecting their property.

=== The Behavioral Risk Audit ===
It is important to understand why people often do not purchase insurance voluntarily. When dealing with uncertain and risky events, individuals tend to be myopic, optimistic and to prefer the status quo. A behavioral risk audit addresses these cognitive biases so that individuals are more likely to pay attention to the potential consequences of low-probability events. Remedial solutions are proposed that work with rather than against people's risk perceptions and decision biases. When combined with short-term economic incentives, individuals are likely to consider investing in protective measures that reduce the potential consequences of future catastrophic events.

== Books ==
- Kunreuther, H., Meyer, R. J., & Michel-Kerjan, E. O. (Eds.). (2019). The Future of Risk Management. University of Pennsylvania Press. ISBN 9780812251326.
- Kunreuther, H., & Useem, M. (2018). Mastering Catastrophic Risk: How Companies Are Coping with Disruption. Oxford University Press. ISBN 9780190499402.
- Meyer, R., & Kunreuther, H. (2017). The Ostrich Paradox: Why We Underprepare for Disasters. Wharton School Press. ISBN 9781613630808.
- Kunreuther, H. C., Pauly, M. V., & McMorrow, S. (2013). Insurance and Behavioral Economics: Improving Decisions in the Most Misunderstood Industry. Cambridge University Press. ISBN 9780521608268.
- Kunreuther, H. C., & Michel-Kerjan, E. O. (2011). At War with the Weather: Managing Large-scale Risks in a New Era of Catastrophes. MIT Press. ISBN 9780262516549. Winner of the 2011 Kulp-Wright Book Award, presented annually by the American Risk and Insurance Association to the author of a book considered to be the most influential text published on the economics of risk management and insurance.
- Daniels, R., Kettl, D., & Kunreuther, H. (2006). On Risk and Disaster: Lessons from Hurricane Katrina. ISBN 9780812219593.
- Grossi, P., & Kunreuther, H. (2005). Catastrophe Modeling: A New Approach to Managing Risk (Vol. 25). Springer Science & Business Media. ISBN 9780387230825.
- Kunreuther, H. C., & Hoch, S. J. (2001). Wharton on Making Decisions. John Wiley & Sons, Inc. ISBN 9780471689386.
- Kunreuther, Howard, and Richard J. Roth. (1998). Paying the Price: The Status and Role of Insurance against Natural Disasters in the United States. Washington, D.C.: Joseph Henry Press. ISBN 9780309063616.
- Easterling, D., & Kunreuther, H. (2013). The Dilemma of Siting a High-level Nuclear Waste Repository (Vol. 5). Springer Science & Business Media. ISBN 9780792394396.
- Kunreuther, H., Ginsberg, R., Miller, L., Sagi, P., Slovic, P., Borkan, B., & Katz, N. (1978). Disaster Insurance Protection: Public Policy Lessons. New York: Wiley. ISBN 9780471032595.
- Dacy, D. C., & Kunreuther, H. The Economics of Natural Disasters: Implications for Federal Policy. ISBN 9780029069301.
