= Technology roadmap =

Planning technique

A technology roadmap is a flexible planning schedule to support strategic and long-range planning, by matching short-term and long-term goals with specific technology solutions. It is a plan that applies to a new product or process and may include using technology forecasting or technology scouting to identify suitable emerging technologies. It is a known technique to help manage the fuzzy front-end of innovation. It is also expected that roadmapping techniques may help companies to survive in turbulent environments and help them to plan in a more holistic way to include non-financial goals and drive towards a more sustainable development. Here roadmaps can be combined with other corporate foresight methods to facilitate systemic change.

Developing a roadmap serves three primary purposes. Firstly, it aids in reaching a consensus on a set of needs and the technologies necessary to address them. Secondly, it offers a mechanism for forecasting technological advancements. Thirdly, it supplies a framework for planning and coordinating technology developments. Additionally, it can function as an analytical tool for charting the evolution and rise of new industries.

== Process ==
The technology roadmapping process may be conducted in three phases: preliminary activities, the development of the roadmap, and the follow-up activities phase. Because the process is too big for one model, the phases are modeled separately. In the models no different roles are made; this is because everything is done by the participants as a group.

=== Phase 1: Preliminary phase ===
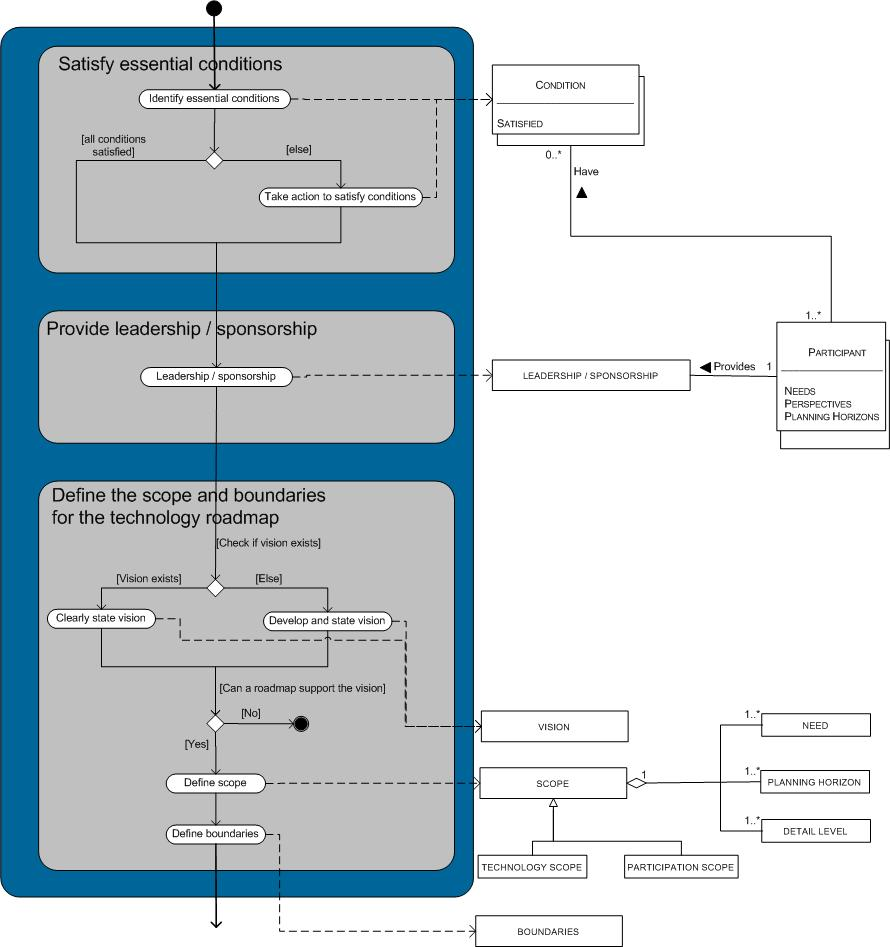
Figure 2. The process-data model of the preliminary phase.

The first phase, the preliminary phase (see figure 2), consists of three steps:

1. satisfy essential conditions,
2. provide leadership / sponsorship, and
3. define the scope and boundaries for the technology roadmap.

In this phase the key decision makers must identify that they have a problem and that technology roadmapping can help them in solving the problem.

==== Satisfy essential conditions ====
In this step it must become clear what the conditions are (they must be identified) and if they are not met, who takes actions to meet them. These conditions include, for example:

- A need for the technology roadmap
- Input and participation from different parts of the organization (e.g., marketing, R&D, the strategic business units) with different planning horizons and perspectives.

All conditions should be satisfied (or an agreed-on party takes necessary actions) to continue to the next step. The participants can have zero or more conditions of their own. It applies to all conditions that have the attribute to be met or not.

==== Provide leadership / sponsorship ====
Committed leadership is needed because of the time and effort involved in creating a technology roadmap. Additionally the leadership should come from one of the participants, one of them provides leadership and sponsorship. This means that the line organization must drive the process and use the roadmap to make resource allocation decisions.

==== Define the scope and boundaries ====
In this step the context for the roadmap is specified. In the company a vision should exist and it must be clear that the roadmap can support that vision. If the vision does not exist one should be developed and clearly stated. When that is done the boundaries and the scope of the roadmap should be specified. Furthermore, the planning horizon and the level of details should be set. The scope can be further divided into the technology scope and the participation scope.

In table 1 all the different sub-activities of the preliminary activity phase can be seen. All the sub-activities have concepts as end products (marked in bold). These concepts are the actual meta-data model, which is an adjusted class diagram.

Table 1. Activity table for the preliminary activity phase
Activity	Sub-Activity	Description
Satisfy essential conditions	Identify essential conditions	When all the **participants** come together, essential **conditions** can be identified (e.g. what groups should be involved, what are the key customers and what are the key suppliers).
Satisfy essential conditions	Take action to satisfy conditions	For technology roadmapping to succeed, **conditions** from the **participants** must be satisfied.
Provide leadership / sponsorship		The part of **leadership** / **sponsorship** should be taken by line organization; they must drive the roadmapping process and use the roadmap to make resource allocation decisions.
Define the scope and boundaries for the technology roadmap	Clearly state vision	The already existing **vision** must be clear.
Define the scope and boundaries for the technology roadmap	Develop vision	The **vision** is developed and stated clearly.
Define the scope and boundaries for the technology roadmap	Define scope	The **scope** of the project can further define the set of **needs**, **planning horizon** and level of **detail**. The scope can be further divided into the **technology scope** and the **participation scope**.
Define the scope and boundaries for the technology roadmap	Define boundaries	The **boundaries** should also be included.

=== Phase 2: Development phase ===
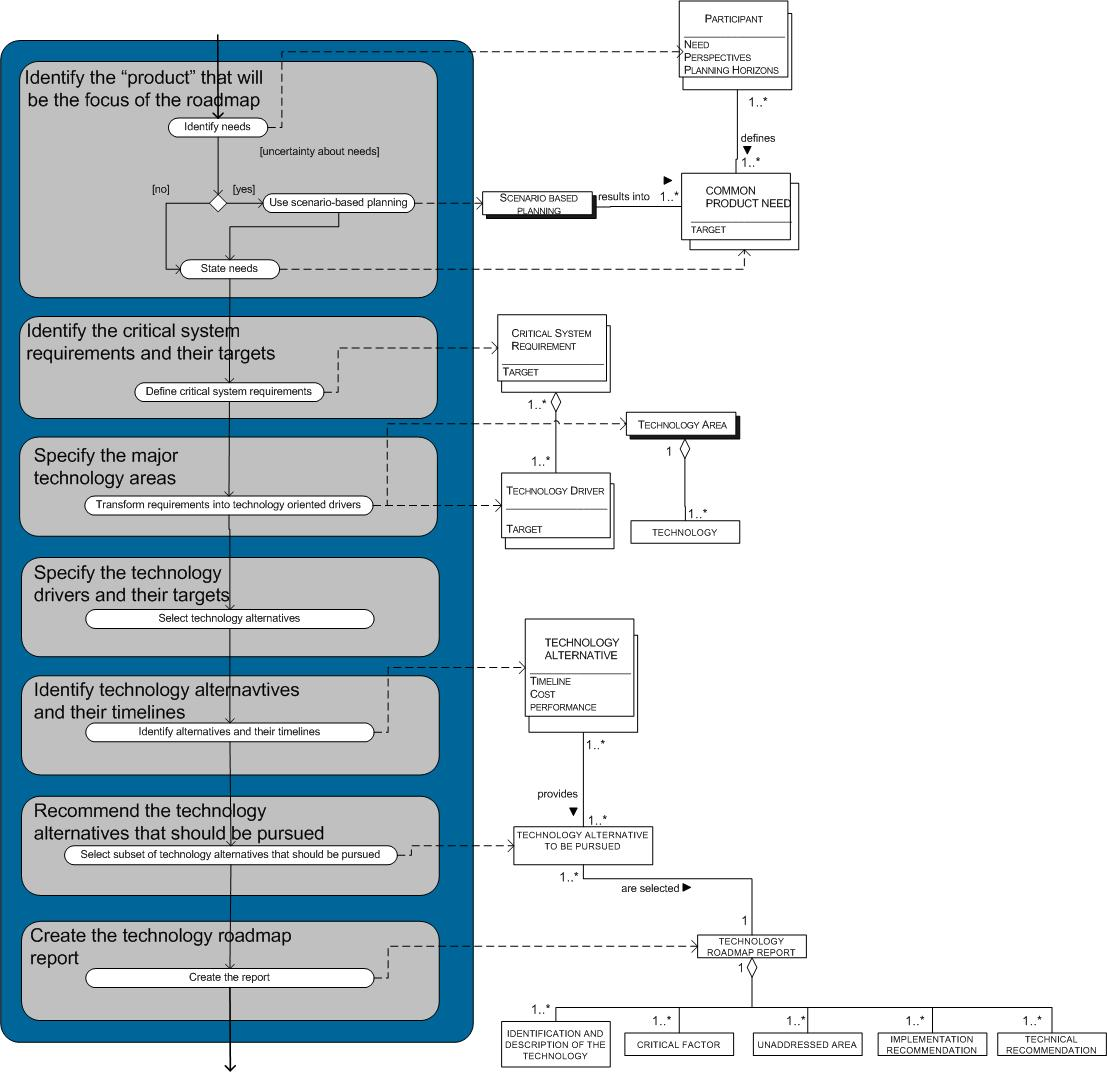
Figure 3. The process-data model of the development phase.

The second phase, the development of the technology roadmap phase (see figure 3.), consists of 7 steps:

1. Identify the "product" that is the focus of the roadmap,

2. Identify the critical system requirements and their targets,
3. Specify the major technology areas,
4. Specify the technology drivers and their targets,
5. Identify technology alternatives and their timelines,
6. Recommend the technology alternatives that should be pursued, and

7. create the technology roadmap report.

— Defense Logistics Agency,

==== Identify the product focus of the roadmap ====
In this step the common product needs are identified and are agreed on by all the participants. This is important to get the acceptance of all groups for the process. In case of uncertainty of the product needs scenario-based planning can be used to determine the common product needs. In figure 3, the participants and possibly the scenario-based planning provide the common product needs.

==== Identify the critical system requirements and their targets ====
Once it is decided what must be roadmapped, the critical system requirements can be identified; they provide the overall framework for the technology roadmap. The requirements can have targets (as an attribute in figure 3) like reliability and costs.

==== Specify the major technology areas ====
These are the areas that help achieve critical system requirements. For each technology area several technologies can be found. Example technology areas are: market assessment, crosscutting technology, component development, and system development.

==== Specify the technology drivers and their targets ====
In this step the critical system requirements from the second step are transformed into technology drivers (with targets) for the specific technology area. These drivers are the critical variables that select the technology alternatives. Drivers depend on the technology areas but they relate to how the technology addresses the critical system requirements.

==== Identify technology alternatives and their timelines ====
At this point the technology drivers and their targets are specified and the technology alternatives that can satisfy those targets should be specified. For each of the alternatives a timeline should be estimated for how it will mature with respect to the technology driver targets.

The time factor can be adapted suitable for the particular situation. The time horizons for e-commerce and software related sectors are usually short. Other distinctions can be made on scale and intervals.

==== Recommend the technology alternatives that should be pursued ====
Because the alternatives may differ in costs, timeline, etc., a selection must be made of the alternatives. These are the alternatives to pursue in figure 3. In this step a lot of trade-offs must be made between different alternatives for different targets: for example, performance over costs and even target over target.

==== Create the report ====
At this point the technology roadmap is finished. In figure 3, it can be seen that the technology roadmap report consists of 5 parts:

1. the identification and description of each technology area,
2. critical factors in the roadmap,
3. unaddressed areas,
4. implementation recommendations, and
5. technical recommendations.

The report can also include additional information. In table 2 all the different sub-activities of the development phase can be seen.

Activity table for the development phase
Activity	Sub-Activity	Description
Identify the "product" the roadmap focuses on	Identify needs	This critical step is to get the participants to identify and agree on the **common product needs**. This is important to get their acceptance.
Identify the "product" the roadmap focuses on	Use Scenario-based planning	If there is major uncertainty about the common product needs, then **scenario-based planning** can be used. Each scenario must be reasonable, internally consistent and comparable with the other scenarios.
Identify the "product" the roadmap focuses on	State needs	These are the needs for the product.
Identify the critical system requirements and their targets	Define critical system requirements	The **critical system requirements** provide the overall framework for the roadmap and are high-level dimensions the technologies relate to. These include things like reliability and costs.
Identify the critical system requirements and their targets	Define targets	For each of the system requirements **targets** must be defined.
Specify the major technology areas	Transform requirements into technology oriented drivers	The major **technology areas** should be specified to help achieve the critical system requirements for the product. The critical system requirements are then transformed into **technology drivers** for the specific technology areas.
Specify the technology drivers and their targets	Select technology alternatives with their targets	**Technology drivers** and their targets are set based on the critical system requirement targets. It specifies how viable **technology alternatives** must be to perform by a certain date. From the available technology alternatives a selection must be made.
Identify technology alternatives and their timelines	Identify alternatives and their timelines	The **technology alternatives** that can satisfy the targets must be identified. Next to this the **timeline** from each alternative must be identified.
Recommend the technology alternatives that should be pursued	Select subset of technology alternatives must pursued	Determine which **technology alternative to pursue** and when to shift to a different technology. Consolidate the best information and develop consensus from many experts.
Create the technology roadmap report	Create the report	Here the actual **technology roadmap report** is created. This report includes: identification and description of the technology, critical factors, unaddressed areas, and implementation recommendations and technical recommendations.

=== Phase 3: Follow-up activity phase ===
This is the moment when the roadmap must be critiqued, validated and hopefully accepted by the group involved in any implementation. This requires a plan developed using the technology roadmap. Next, there must be a periodical review and update point, because needs from the participants and the technologies evolve.

== The fast-start approach to roadmapping ==
Given the potential complexity and organisational inertia surrounding the creation of roadmaps, researchers at the University of Cambridge focused on developing a fast-start approach to roadmapping. This approach, called T-Plan, was created in the late 1990s primarily to help organisations take the first step into roadmapping with minimal resource and time commitment. It has been influential in the propagation and uptake of roadmapping internationally including translations of the T-Plan workbook into Chinese (traditional & modern), German, Japanese and Spanish. The approach (as well as its counterpart for innovation and strategy roadmapping, S-Plan) is flexible and scalable, and therefore can be easily customised for efficient application. Fast and lean approaches are particularly important for small and medium enterprises (SME) and have been shown to work in particularly to give directions to clusters of SMEs.

== Planning and business development context ==
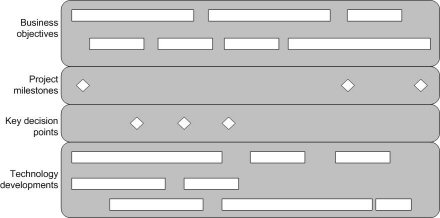
5. Programme planning example.

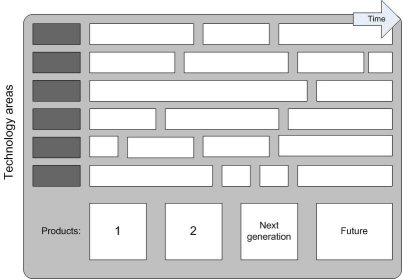
6. Bars example.

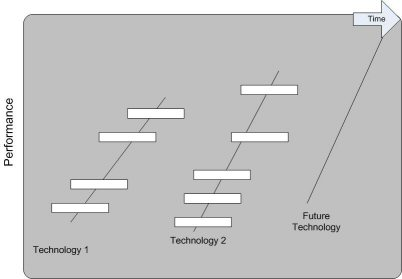
7. Graphs example.

The process of technology roadmapping fits into corporate strategy, corporate strategic planning, technology planning and the business development context. Three critical elements should be connected: needs, products, and technology.

=== Knowledge and skills required ===
==== Consultant with skills ====
Creating a technology roadmap requires certain knowledge and skills. Some of the participants must know the purpose of technology roadmapping. Next to this group-process and interpersonal skills are required since the process includes a lot of discussions and finding out what the common need is. If the number of participants is really large there might be need for a consultant or facilitator.

=== Purpose ===
==== Product planning in roadmapping ====
This is the most common type of a technology roadmap: linking the insertion of technologies into products.

==== Programme planning ====
This type is more directed to the implementation of strategy and related to project planning. Figure 5 shows the relationships between technology development phases, programme phases and milestones.

==== Formats ====
- Bars: Almost all the roadmaps are (partly) expressed in bars for each layer. This makes the roadmaps very simple and unified, which makes the communication and integration easier.
- Graphs: A technology roadmap can also be expressed as a graph, usually one for each of the sub layers. (e.g. IMEC uses the second method).

== Case studies ==
Documented case studies include:

- ABB
- Mining
- Motorola
- Philips
- Siemens

== See also ==
- Work breakdown structure
- Requirement prioritization
- Software product management
- Product strategy
- Enterprise systems engineering
- Information technology planning
- Strategic management
- Strategic technology plan
- Technology life cycle
- Product lifecycle management
- Business plan
- Project network
