= Jonathan Brill =

Entrepreneur, author, keynote speaker

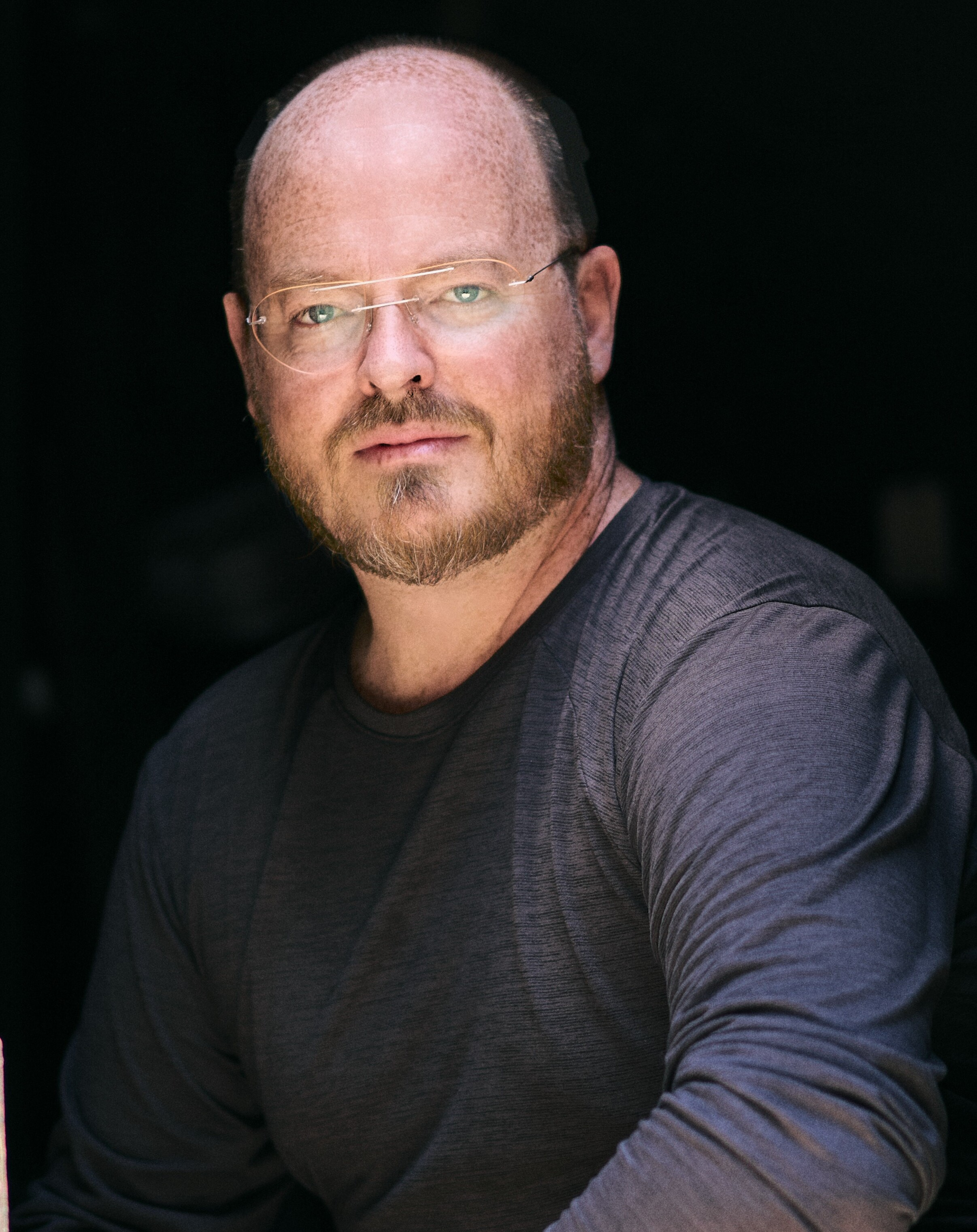
- Brill in 2024
- Born: 1967 (age 58–59); United States
- Education: Pratt Institute, Stanford Graduate School of Business
- Occupations: Entrepreneur, author, keynote speaker
- Known for: Writing and speaking about future trends in technology for major businesses
- Website: jonathanbrill.com

Jonathan Brill is an American business futurist, keynote speaker, and author, known for his work on strategic foresight, disruption preparedness, and innovation leadership.

He is the author of AI and the Octopus Organization: Building the Superintelligent Firm and Rogue Waves: Future-Proof Your Business to Survive and Profit from Radical Change and advises Fortune 50 companies and U.S. government agencies.

== Early life and education ==
Brill was born in 1967 in the United States. He obtained a degree in industrial design from Pratt Institute, served as a research consultant to the MIT Media Lab, and completed executive education at the Stanford Graduate School of Business.

== Career ==
Brill is the Founder and Executive Chairman of the Center for Radical Change, where he advises global business and government leaders on how to identify, manage, and transform change into innovation and opportunity. He is a board member at one of the world's largest private intelligence agencies, a Senior Fellow at the Harvard Business Review's China New Growth Institute, and Amazon's Futurist in Residence.

Brill is an active business futurist and keynote speaker. Forbes ranked him among the top futurists in their "5 Futurists To Watch In Uncertain Times", and Harvard Business Review described him as "The world's leading transformation architect." His talks draw upon his experience as a technology and intelligence executive, including at:

- Futurist-in-Residence at Amazon
- Global Futurist at HP – led long-range strategy, innovation, and global intelligence across 32 countries
- Adjunct Faculty, Singularity University
- Futurist in Residence, Territory Studio
- Board Advisor & Fellow, Frost & Sullivan
- Co-founder, Special Projects Agency
- CEO, CCD Innovation
- Creative Director, Frog Design

He has consulted on the development of over 350 products for major technology and consumer brands, as well as the United States government. Projects have ranged from metaverse technologies to theme park rides and design of the US Pavilion at Expo Milano 2015 to Taco Bell's Gordita.

== Bibliography ==
Brill is the author of two books:

- AI and the Octopus Organization: Building the Superintelligent Firm (MenloPark, 2025), is a call to action for leaders to fundamentally rethink how organizations operate in the AI age.
- Rogue Waves: Future-Proof Your Business to Survive and Profit from Radical Change (McGraw-Hill, 2021), a business strategy book on navigating systemic disruption. The book draws on his years of experience as an executive, advisor, and inventor to deliver a practical action plan for managing change. It received positive reviews from The Economist and business author Adam Grant, who described it as "An actionable framework for driving change instead of being blindsided by it."

Other writing and media includes:

- The Octopus Organization Podcast
- CIO Magazine: "The octopus playbook: What nature’s smartest cephalopod can teach leaders about AI"
- Psychology Today: "AI Anxiety at Work?"
- Forbes Thinkers50: "Building Resilient Organizations"
- Forbes: "Building Your Rogue Radar: How to Spot Unexpected Peril and Opportunity"
- Harvard Business Review: "Identify — and Mitigate — Risks to Your Career", co-authored with Dorie Clark

== Speaking and media coverage ==
Brill has delivered keynote addressed to executives in 29 countries, including events such as TEDx, SXSW, the Global Peter Drucker Forum, and the Aspen Institute.

He has been featured in:

- ABC News – 2024 New Year's Special
- CBS Green Bay – Interviews on AI and economic disruption
- Bloomberg Radio – Interview on the book Rogue Waves
- CNN Chile – Singularity Summit
- Newsweek Podcast – How to Adapt to Exponential Change
- San Francisco Business Times – Executive profile
- Diario Financiero (Chile) – Feature on future strategy
- Psychology Today – AI Anxiety at Work
- Radio La Clava – AI Models for Organizations
- National Geographic – Software Creates New Flavors, Some Not for the Squeamish
- SXSW 2026 – Art as an Identity in a Jobless Future
- El Mundo interview with Jonathan Brill
- Jonathan Brill on Wake Up America Weekend

Other notable appearances include:

- TED Interview – Future‑Proofing Your Business in Our Rogue Wave Era
- TKC Podcast – Building Your Ideal Future with AI
- Autodesk – 8 Future‑Proofing Business Strategies from Jonathan Brill
- Fireside Chat with Rita McGrath
- How HP Turns Business Catastrophes to Their Advantage
- Innovation Despite Rogue Waves
- Balancing Risks and Rewards of Innovation in engineering and manufacturing
- Digital Disruption with Geoff Nielson: What AI Can Never Understand
- Just Start – Interview by Adam Mendler
- CNN Prime Chile – Singularity Summit Additional Coverage
- Corporate board member Magazine – Rethinking Risk After The Pandemic
- El País – Jonathan Brill, ‘futurólogo’ de IA
- Psychology Today – How to Move Beyond the AI Pilot
- Clarin – Jonathan Brill, futurólogo: “En los próximos cinco años van a colisionar en el mundo cinco tendencias impulsadas por la IA”
