= Scientific lacuna =

Scientific lacuna describes an area of science that has not been studied but has the potential to be studied scientifically. Often, this may be the case because it falls between different areas of sciences, such that it doesn't fall into a single specific discipline of science. However, it also may be the case that the right situation for study has not yet occurred, or the conditions for study have been too ephemeral. Scientific lacunae often have the potential to be studied in the future when more areas of science are explicitly defined or the right conditions do occur, yet this can be made difficult if the area of science is commonly not considered a proper area for scientific study.
