= Morbidity and mortality conference =

Conference for reviewing poor/unusual outcomes of medical cases

Morbidity and mortality (M&M) conferences are traditional, recurring conferences held by medical services at academic medical centers, most large private medical and surgical practices, and other medical centers. Their use in psychiatric medicine is less prevalent. Death, deterioration and complications may be unavoidable in some patients due to underlying disease processes. However they may also be associated with errors or omissions in patient care. M&M conferences involve the analysis of adverse outcomes in patient care through peer review. The objectives of a well-run M&M conference are to identify adverse outcomes associated with medical error, to modify behavior and judgment based on previous experiences, and to prevent repetition of errors leading to complications. Conferences are non-punitive and focus on the goal of improved patient care. The proceedings are generally kept confidential by law. M&M conferences occur with regular frequency, often weekly, biweekly or monthly, and highlight recent cases and identify areas of improvement for clinicians involved in the case. They are particularly important for identifying systems issues (e.g., outdated policies, changes in patient identification procedures, arithmetic errors, etc.) which affect patient care.

The results of a survey that endeavored to study the relevance and traits of morbidity and mortality conferences (M&MCs) in the spring of 1998 indicate that 90% of U.S. internal medicine training programs hold M&MCs. The majority of these conferences occur on a monthly basis, where an assigned leader reviews certain select cases that had unpredicted consequences or a suspected medical error. It was also reported that two-thirds of the hospitals use the M&MCs as a means to fulfill their administrative requirements for quality assurance.

== History ==
Morbidity and Mortality conferences have long been part of the practice of medicine, having originated in the early 1900s with Ernest Codman at Massachusetts General Hospital in Boston. He lost his staff privileges there after suggesting the evaluating of surgeon competence. Codman's ideas contributed to the standardization of hospital practices – including a case report system that ascribed responsibility for adverse outcomes – by the American College of Surgeons in 1916. As the medical profession evolved, physicians grew accustomed to discussing their errors at mortality conferences, where autopsy findings were presented, and in published case reports. By 1983, the ACGME began requiring that accredited residency programs conduct a weekly review of all complications and deaths.

== Methods ==
A Mortality Review Task Force reviews and selects cases to be presented at each M&M conference. Cases selected include all deaths, significant patient injuries, and near-death situations. A core team of senior quality consultants prepares the selected cases for presentation, gathering and reviewing information that may have caused the case. Hospital physicians, residents, and staff are encouraged to attend the MM&I. During the MM&I meetings the leader reminds the participants of MM&I's confidentiality. Resident leaders present the cases and literature relating to the cases. Then the participants discuss and identify issues that may have led to the undesirable outcome. At the end of the conference, the leader reminds the participants of the MM&I's confidentiality once again and evaluates the conference.
