= Futures & Foresight Science =

- Discipline: Futures Studies
- Language: English
- Edited by: George Wright

Publication details
- History: 2019–present
- Publisher: Wiley
- Frequency: Quarterly
- Open access: Hybrid

Standard abbreviations
- ISO 4: Futures Foresight Sci.

Indexing
- ISSN: 2573-5152
- OCLC no.: 990141661

Links
- Journal homepage; Online archive

Futures & Foresight Science is a quarterly peer-reviewed academic journal published by Wiley. It covers research on advancing methods that aid anticipating the future. The journal was established in 2019 by founding editor-in-chief George Wright (University of Strathclyde).

== Abstracting and indexing ==
The journal is abstracted and indexed in the Directory of Open Access Journals, EBSCO databases, Inspec, and Scopus.

== See also ==
- Technological Forecasting and Social Change
- Futures
- Journal of Futures Studies
- Foresight
