= After-action review =

Structured review process

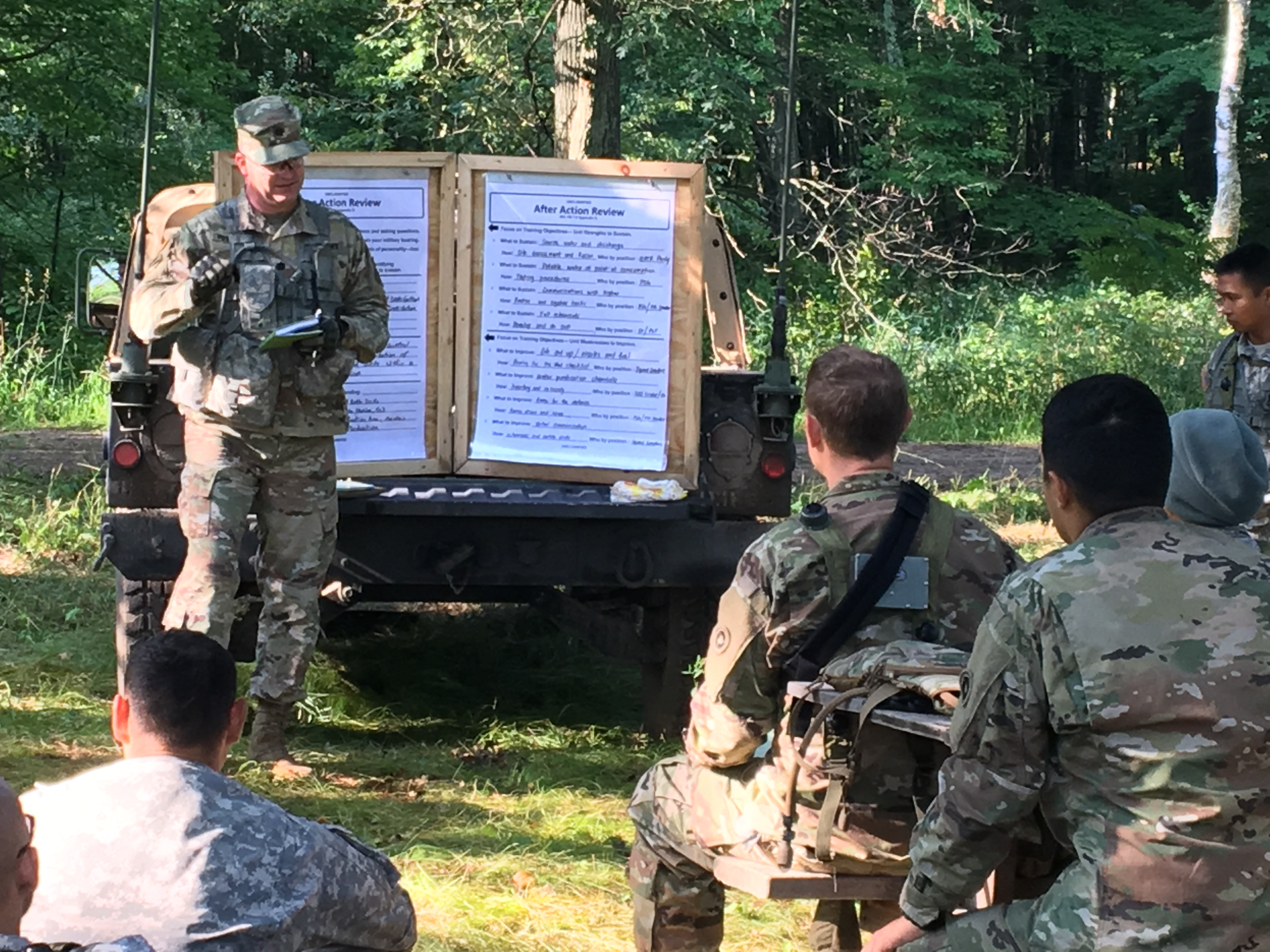
1-337 conducting an After Action Review for an Army Reserve unit at Camp Ripley during CSTX 86-17-03

An after action review (AAR) is a technique for improving process and execution by analyzing the intended outcome and actual outcome of an action and identifying practices to sustain, and practices to improve or initiate, and then practicing those changes at the next iteration of the action AARs in the formal sense were originally developed by the U.S. Army. Formal AARs are used by all US military services and by many other non-US organizations. Their use has extended to business as a knowledge management tool.

An AAR occurs within a cycle of establishing the leader's intent, planning, preparation, action and review. An AAR is distinct from a de-brief in that it begins with a clear comparison of intended versus actual results achieved. An AAR is forward-looking, with the goal of informing future planning, preparation, and execution of similar actions. Assigning blame or issuing reprimands is antithetical to the purpose of an AAR. An AAR is distinct from a post-mortem in its tight focus on participants' own actions; learning from the review is taken forward by the participants. Recommendations for others are not produced. AARs in larger operations can be cascaded in order to keep each level of the organization focused on its own performance within a particular event or project.

Formal AAR meetings are normally run by a facilitator or trained 'AAR Conductor', and can be chronological reviews or tightly focused on a few key issues selected by the team leader. Short cycle informal AARs are typically run by a team leader or assistant and are very quick.

== After action reviews in the British National Health Service ==
In the United Kingdom's National Health Service (NHS), AAR is increasingly used as a learning tool to promote patient safety and improve care, as outlined by Walker et al. 2012. In the UK and Europe other healthcare organisations, including pharmaceutical and medical technology businesses such as BD, are beginning to roll out their own AAR programmes.

In 2008, a group of senior leaders within University College London Hospitals NHS Foundation Trust acted on the realization that bullying and blaming behaviours were impacting on safe and effective care. They commissioned the UCLH Education service to tackle the problem, and AAR was chosen as the tool to use.

In 2011, Professor Aidan Hallighan, UCLH's Director of Education, wrote "Healthcare is dominated by the extreme, the unknown and the very improbable with high impact consequences, conditions that demand leadership, and yet we spend our time focusing on what we know and what we can control. Educating staff on the use of After Action Review enables team working and cues behaviours through allowing an emotional mastery of the moment and learning after doing."

"AARs are applicable to almost any event, clinical or otherwise, and whilst the emphasis is on learning after less than perfect events, AARs after successful experiences can also provide rich benefits. Prerequisite to the success of a formal AAR are a few key ingredients, including a trained ‘conductor’, a suitable safe private environment, allocated time and the assumption of equality of everybody present. Every AAR follows the same structure with the conductor getting agreement for the ground rules at the outset and ensuring everyone is clear about the specific purpose of the AAR and the four apparently simple questions to be used."

AAR is actively used in a number of NHS organisations including Cambridge University Hospitals, Bedfordshire Hospitals and NEL Healthcare Consulting and has been recommended as an approach to be used in the new NHS Patient Safety Incident Response Framework, which "moves away from reactive and hard-to-define thresholds for 'Serious Incident' investigation and towards a proactive approach to learning from incidents."

== See also ==
- List of established military terms
- After action report
- Morbidity and mortality conference
