= Debriefing =

Report back and review on a project or mission after completion

Debriefing is a report of a mission or project, or the information so obtained. It is a structured process following an exercise or event that reviews the actions taken. As a technical term, it implies a specific and active intervention process that has developed with more formal meanings such as operational debriefing. It is classified into different types, which include military, experiential, and psychological debriefing, among others.

== Model ==
The popular meaning of debriefing is that "of telling about what has happened" with a sense of reviewing or going over an experience or actions in order to achieve order and meaning concerning what was reported. It is a structured process that also evaluates the contributions of various participants in the determination of success or failure of the operation. The processes may involve receiving an explanation; receiving information and situation-based reminders of context; and reporting of measures of performance, and/or opportunities to further investigate the results of a study, investigation, or assessment of performance after participation in an immersive activity is complete.

Aside from the goal of inciting reflection and encouraging communication, debriefing is also used to explore the emotions of the participant. This variable helps frame the experience in such a way that it enhances the learning.

Effective debriefings typically include the following essential elements:

- Active participation with more than just the passive receipt of feedback
- Developmental intent focused on learning and improvement
- Discussion of specific events
- Input from multiple sources

== Types ==
=== Military ===
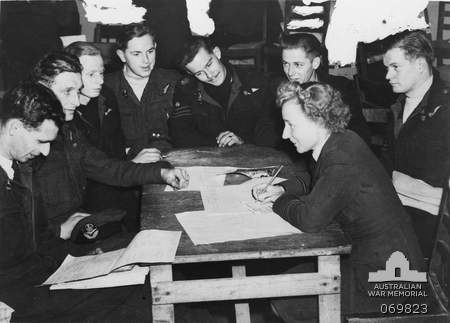
Female intelligence officer at the Royal Air Force Station receiving a report from members of the crew of G George, Avro Lancaster of 460 Squadron RAAF, after an attack on Berlin, 26 November 1943.

Throughout the existence of combat and the history of war, engaging with the emotional and psychological impact on soldiers has been an ongoing and conflicting conversation. Debriefings in the military originated for three purposes: to mitigate the psychological impact of traumatic events, alleviate acute stress response, and reduce the frequency of post-traumatic stress disorder, also known as PTSD. Though there are several types of debriefing strategies, the following three are frequently used within military groups:

1. Historical group debriefing – refers to the process of collecting historical patterns of trauma through the use of group therapy. This process happens with soldiers recounting combat events in chronological order and adding their own reactions of thoughts and feelings. The key objective of this strategy is to allow men to "talk it out" in a way that they are not commonly socialized to do so. Though this group therapy process does not aim to reduce stress, it has resulted in providing a feeling of relief and connection amongst the soldiers.
2. Critical incident stress debriefing (CISD) – a form of psychological debriefing that features a specific structure and format, which were developed to address critical incident stress experienced by emergency service workers. It was developed by Jeffrey Mitchell and is considered the most widely used today. It operates using the following three components: pre-incident functions, on-scene support services, and post-incident interventions. Pre-incident functions refers to the education and coping mechanisms taught to those who are more vulnerable to traumatization before they enter combat. On-scene support services entails brief discussions and unstructured therapy sessions that occur within a few hours of an incident that may cause high stress responses in soldiers. Finally, post-incident interventions occur usually at least 24 hours after an incident to give the soldiers a bit more time to deescalate from a having high stress response to that incident. The process is peer-driven but backed-up by a group of professional counselors.
3. Process debriefing – it is similar to the other debriefing strategies in that it focuses on the group narrative; however, it differs because it prioritizes the leadership and effectiveness of the facilitators who lead the debriefing sessions. These facilitators are provided with professional development on how to plan for and lead the group sessions. In cases of deception-based experiences where the participant was manipulated or provided with false information, the process include a discussion with the participant how the deception might have temporarily altered or influenced his self-perceptions.

All of these debriefing strategies maximize on the collective experience of soldiers, rather than on the individual. There is a growing belief that allowing soldiers to reflect and problem-solve as a group builds their relationship with each other over time and ultimately, their effectiveness as a unit. It also provides them with an outlet rather than forcing them to become consumed by their thoughts. Typically, the role of a soldier is seen as a job and a courageous duty, which does not give value to the psychological and emotional need of reflection. Conclusively, in order to make the role of a soldier more sustainable, captains and group leaders must prioritize debriefing strategies to focus more on the whole person.

=== Experiential learning ===
Ernesto Yturralde, experiential trainer and researcher, explains: "In the field of experiential learning methodology, the debriefing is a semi-structured process by which the facilitator, once a certain activity is accomplished, makes a series of progressive questions in this session, with an adequate sequence that let the participants reflect what happened, giving important insights with the aim of that project towards the future, linking the challenge with the actions and the future." It is analogous to "providing feedback" as it constitutes a vital component of any simulation intervention or any educational intervention, involving a process of explanation, analysis, and synthesis, with an active facilitator-participant interface.

"Emotional Decompression" is one style of psychological debriefing proposed by David Kinchin in his 2007 book by that name.

Experiential learning debriefing is the basis for debriefing in Medical Simulation, used widely within healthcare.

=== Crisis intervention ===
Trauma-exposed individuals often receive treatment called psychological debriefing in an effort to prevent PTSD, which consists of interviews that are meant to allow individuals to directly confront the event and share their feelings with the counselor and to help structure their memories of the event.

However, several meta-analyses find that psychological debriefing is unhelpful and is potentially harmful. A 2019 Cochrane Systematic Review found low-quality evidence suggesting potential benefit for some people, however, the studies performed had a high degree of uncertainty due to bias and the evidence is not strong enough to recommend multiple sessions of early psychological interventions for all people who are exposed to trauma. As of 2017 The American Psychological Association assessed psychological debriefing as No Research Support/Treatment is Potentially Harmful.

Critical incident stress debriefing is a crisis intervention program that is used to provide initial psychosocial relief to rescue workers. It is generally conducted in a group session and held between 24 and 72 hours of the disaster. Each debriefing session follows seven phases:

1. Introduction to set rules
2. Fact phase to establish what happened
3. Cognition phase to discuss thoughts about what happened
4. Reaction phase to discuss emotions associated with what happened
5. Symptoms phase to learn the signs and symptoms of distress
6. Educational phase to learn about post traumatic stress disorder (PTSD) and coping strategies
7. Re-entry phase to discuss any other issues and to provide any additional services.

The goal of this type of debriefing is to stop the individuals from developing PTSD. Although this debriefing is widely used, there is uncertainty how it affects an individual. Researchers Mayou, Ehlers and Hobbs in 2000 were interested in evaluating the 3-year results of a randomized controlled trial of debriefing for consecutive subjects admitted to the hospital following a traffic accident. The patients were assessed in the hospital using the Impact of Event Scale (IES), Brief Symptom Inventory (BSI) and a questionnaire, and were then reassessed at 3 years and 3 months. The intervention used was psychological debriefing. The results showed that the intervention group had significantly worse psychiatric symptoms, travel anxiety, physical problems, and financial problems.

In an earlier study conducted by Carlier et al. in 1998, they looked at the symptomatology in police officers that had been debriefed and not debriefed following a civilian plane crash. The results showed that the two groups did not differ in pre-event or post event distress. Furthermore, those who had undergone debriefing had significantly more disaster-related hyper arousal symptoms.

Overall, these results showed that caution should be used when using Critical Incident Stress Debriefing. Studies have shown that it is ineffective and has adverse long-term effects, and is not an appropriate treatment for trauma victims.

=== Psychological research ===
In psychological research, a debriefing is a short interview that takes place between researchers and research participants immediately following their participation in a psychology experiment. The debriefing is an important ethical consideration to make sure that participants are fully informed about, and not psychologically or physically harmed in any way by, their experience in an experiment. Along with informed consent, the debriefing is considered to be a fundamental ethical precaution in research involving human beings. It is especially important in social psychology experiments that use deception. Debriefing is typically not used in surveys, observational studies, or other forms of research that involve no deception and minimal risk to participants.

Methodological advantages of a debriefing include "the ability of researchers to check the effectiveness of a manipulation, or to identify participants who were able to guess the hypothesis or spot a deception." If the data have been compromised in this way, then those participants should be excluded from the analysis. Many psychologists feel that these benefits justify a post-experimental follow-up even in the absence of deception or stressful procedures.

=== Organizational ===
Debriefing in the business discipline is largely instrumental to project management, particularly in "accelerating projects, innovating novel approaches, and hitting difficult objectives". Debriefs are considered to primarily serve developmental purposes rather than evaluative or judgmental. They are also considered to have more of a developmental intent than an administrative intent, such as in a performance appraisal. One difference in organizational and/or project management is that the debriefing process is not only conducted after the conclusion of other events, but can also be conducted in real-time to continuously evolve plans during execution. The main reason for focusing on debriefing in an organizational or even in a project management capacity, is to increase effectiveness of the team, both individually and collectively. One study found that properly conducted debriefings can help organizations realize individual and team performance improvements by about 20-25%.

On the conclusion of a tendering exercise for a business contract, both successful and unsuccessful tenderers may be offered a debriefing meeting.

==== Techniques ====
Fundamentally, key questions to consider during a debriefing session are:

- What were we trying to accomplish?
- Where did we hit (or miss) our objectives?
- What caused our results?
- What should we start, stop, or continue doing?

Often, structuring debriefings by following a plan or outline visiting the main functions of the debriefing process are considered more efficient. Most debriefings require at least some planning and organization prior to assembly of the team.

==== Technology ====
Digital tools have emerged aiming to automate the preparation of a debriefing session, based on the anonymous answers to questions asked of individual team members. This information can then be used to generate a discussion guide for the person in charge of the debrief to guide that particular session. There is also an emergent debriefing model called "digital debriefing", which involves video-facilitated instructor debriefing. Due to the technologies used, this type of debriefing can be conducted remotely.

== Efficacy and challenges ==
A 2013 meta-analysis by Scott I. Tannenbaum and Christopher P. Cerasoli examined 46 samples involving 2,136 participants. The authors reported an average improvement in effectiveness of approximately 25% for individual and team debriefs compared with control groups.

Debriefings are most effective when conducted interactively between the participants of the immersive activity and the assessment or observation personnel. Self-facilitated after action reviews (AAR) or debriefings are common in small unit and crew activities, and in a training context are shown to improve Knowledge, Skills, and Abilities (KSAs) significantly when conducted formally using pre-defined measures of performance derived from front-end analysis. Debriefing organization can be based on linear or non-linear (or a combination of both) organization of markers used for recall. Typically the structure will use: Temporal, Spatial, Objective, and/or Performance derived markers to bring focus to a specific activity.

Teams in occupations and high-risk settings such as the healthcare field, emergency services like fire-fighting and policing, and military settings frequently use debriefing techniques for team learning and to avoid making costly mistakes. For example, in the health care field, it is important for a team of doctors to be high-performing in coming up with innovative solutions to health problems while maintaining the patients quality of life. Debriefings in the health care field are becoming increasingly popular and more widely used after claims of malpractice in emergency departments were reviewed and over 50 cases examined that showed how a high-performing team could have eliminated or mitigated major problems including death and impairments.

Several examples of low-risk teams that can benefit from debriefing include: project teams, sports teams, production or manufacturing teams, and consultant teams.

=== Common challenges ===
Many leaders display all of the correct skills for successful leadership including interpersonal skills, technical competence, etc., but lack a very important skill which is the ability to effectively debrief and ensure continuous learning of their team. Without guidance or structure for an effective debriefing process, it is more likely that leaders will experience some of the common challenges that are found in debriefing.

Below are some ways to maximize team effectiveness, avoid the common challenges faced in debriefing, and maintain high team performance:

- Avoid discussing task work issues, and instead, focus on addressing teamwork issues. Teamwork is especially important when team members need to rely on each other for information or support to see the project through. A meta-analysis of teamwork processes found that teams that function effectively are more committed, believe they can succeed, and ultimately are about 25% more successful which supports why debrief sessions should include an examination of teamwork.
- Be sure to involve the team in discussions surrounding team effectiveness and allow the team to establish their own action plans. It is important to gather the perspective of the people who are most involved so that subsequent decisions are made with complete information. A study which discusses the key characteristics of effective and ineffective developmental interactions shows that interactions that allow someone to discover their own needs and come up with workable solutions are more effective than those where a leader tells the team what they need. Leaders should perform participative debriefs and give their team members the opportunity to reflect, discuss, and share their own perspectives before providing direction.
- Debriefs should not only be effective but must be efficient as well. Teams can easily get into the weeds and spend valuable time discussing topics that can be taken offline or tabled for a later discussion. Spending too much time covering topics that do not add value to the project can discourage future participation in debriefs.

== See also ==
- Briefing note
