= Scenario planning =

Futures studies / Futures techniques method

Scenario planning, scenario thinking, scenario analysis, scenario prediction and the scenario method all describe a strategic planning method that some organizations use to make flexible long-term plans. It is in large part an adaptation and generalization of classic methods used by military intelligence.

In the most common application of the method, analysts generate simulation games for policy makers. The method combines known facts, such as demographics, geography and mineral reserves, with military, political, and industrial information, and key driving forces identified by a PEST analysis or one of its variants, which consider social, technical, economic, environmental, and political aspects of an organisation's business environment.

In business applications, the emphasis on understanding the behavior of opponents has been reduced while more attention is now paid to changes in the natural environment. At Royal Dutch Shell for example, scenario planning has been described as changing mindsets about the exogenous part of the world prior to formulating specific strategies.

Scenario planning may involve aspects of systems thinking, specifically the recognition that many factors may combine in complex ways to create sometimes surprising futures (due to non-linear feedback loops). The method also allows the inclusion of factors that are difficult to formalize, such as novel insights about the future, deep shifts in values, and unprecedented regulations or inventions. Systems thinking used in conjunction with scenario planning leads to plausible scenario storylines because the causal relationship between factors can be demonstrated. These cases, in which scenario planning is integrated with a systems thinking approach to scenario development, are sometimes referred to as "dynamic scenarios".

Critics of using a subjective and heuristic methodology to deal with uncertainty and complexity argue that the technique has not been examined rigorously, nor influenced sufficiently by scientific evidence. They caution against using such methods to "predict" based on what can be described as arbitrary themes and "forecasting techniques".

A challenge and a strength of scenario-building is that "predictors are part of the social context about which they are trying to make a prediction and may influence that context in the process". As a consequence, societal predictions can become self-destructing. For example, a scenario in which a large percentage of a population will become HIV infected based on existing trends may cause more people to avoid risky behavior and thus reduce the HIV infection rate, invalidating the forecast (which might have remained correct if it had not been publicly known). Or, a prediction that cybersecurity will become a major issue may cause organizations to implement more secure cybersecurity measures, thus limiting the issue.

== Principle ==
=== Crafting scenarios ===
Combinations and permutations of fact and related social changes are called "scenarios". Scenarios usually include plausible, but unexpectedly important, situations and problems that exist in some nascent form in the present day. Any particular scenario is unlikely. However, futures studies analysts select scenario features so they are both possible and uncomfortable. Scenario planning helps policy-makers and firms anticipate change, prepare responses, and create more robust strategies.

=== Wargames ===
Analysts design wargames so that policy makers have flexibility and freedom to adapt their simulated organisations.

== Applications ==
=== Business ===
In the past, strategic plans have often considered only the "official future", which was usually a straight-line graph of current trends carried into the future. Often the trend lines were generated by the accounting department, and lacked discussions of demographics, or qualitative differences in social conditions.

These simplistic guesses are surprisingly good most of the time, but fail to consider qualitative social changes that can affect a business or government. Paul J. H. Schoemaker offers a managerial case for the use of scenario planning in business.

The approach may have had more impact outside Shell than within, as many others firms and consultancies started utilizing scenario planning. Scenario planning is prone to a variety of traps (both in process and content) as enumerated by Paul J. H. Schoemaker. More recently scenario planning has been discussed as a tool to improve the strategic agility, by cognitively preparing not only multiple scenarios but also multiple consistent strategies.

=== Finance ===
In economics and finance, a financial institution might use scenario analysis to forecast several possible scenarios for the economy (e.g. rapid growth, moderate growth, slow growth) and for financial returns (for bonds, stocks, cash, etc.) in each of those scenarios. It might consider sub-sets of each of the possibilities. It might further seek to determine correlations and assign probabilities to the scenarios (and sub-sets if any). Then it will be in a position to consider how to distribute assets between asset types (i.e. asset allocation); the institution can also calculate the scenario-weighted expected return (which figure will indicate the overall attractiveness of the financial environment). It may also perform stress testing, using adverse scenarios.

It can be difficult to foresee what the future holds (e.g. the actual future outcome may be entirely unexpected), i.e. to foresee what the scenarios are, and to assign probabilities to them; and this is true of the general forecasts never mind the implied financial market returns. The outcomes can be modeled mathematically/statistically e.g. taking account of possible variability within single scenarios as well as possible relationships between scenarios. In general, one should take care when assigning probabilities to different scenarios as this could invite a tendency to consider only the scenario with the highest probability.

== History of use by academic and commercial organizations ==
Most authors attribute the introduction of scenario planning to Herman Kahn through his work for the US Military in the 1950s at the RAND Corporation where he developed a technique of describing the future in stories as if written by people in the future. He adopted the term "scenarios" to describe these stories. In 1961 he founded the Hudson Institute where he expanded his scenario work to social forecasting and public policy. One of his most controversial uses of scenarios was to suggest that a nuclear war could be won. Though Kahn is often cited as the father of scenario planning, at the same time Kahn was developing his methods at RAND, Gaston Berger was developing similar methods at the Centre d'Etudes Prospectives which he founded in France. His method, which he named 'La Prospective', was to develop normative scenarios of the future which were to be used as a guide in formulating public policy. During the mid-1960s various authors from the French and American institutions began to publish scenario planning concepts such as 'La Prospective' by Berger in 1964 and 'The Next Thirty-Three Years' by Kahn and Wiener in 1967. By the 1970s scenario planning was in full swing with a number of institutions now established to provide support to business including the Hudson Foundation, the Stanford Research Institute (now SRI International), and the SEMA Metra Consulting Group in France. Several large companies also began to embrace scenario planning including DHL Express, Dutch Royal Shell and General Electric.

Possibly as a result of these very sophisticated approaches, and of the difficult techniques they employed (which usually demanded the resources of a central planning staff), scenarios earned a reputation for difficulty (and cost) in use. Even so, the theoretical importance of the use of alternative scenarios, to help address the uncertainty implicit in long-range forecasts, was dramatically underlined by the widespread confusion which followed the Oil Shock of 1973. As a result, many of the larger organizations started to use the technique in one form or another. By 1983 Diffenbach reported that 'alternate scenarios' were the third most popular technique for long-range forecasting – used by 68% of the large organizations he surveyed.

Practical development of scenario forecasting, to guide strategy rather than for the more limited academic uses which had previously been the case, was started by Pierre Wack in 1971 at the Royal Dutch Shell group of companies – and it, too, was given impetus by the Oil Shock two years later. Shell has, since that time, led the commercial world in the use of scenarios – and in the development of more practical techniques to support these. Indeed, as – in common with most forms of long-range forecasting – the use of scenarios has (during the depressed trading conditions of the last decade) reduced to only a handful of private-sector organisations, Shell remains almost alone amongst them in keeping the technique at the forefront of forecasting.

There has only been anecdotal evidence offered in support of the value of scenarios, even as aids to forecasting; and most of this has come from one company – Shell. In addition, with so few organisations making consistent use of them – and with the timescales involved reaching into decades – it is unlikely that any definitive supporting evidenced will be forthcoming in the foreseeable future. For the same reasons, though, a lack of such proof applies to almost all long-range planning techniques. In the absence of proof, but taking account of Shell's well documented experiences of using it over several decades (where, in the 1990s, its then CEO ascribed its success to its use of such scenarios), can be significant benefit to be obtained from extending the horizons of managers' long-range forecasting in the way that the use of scenarios uniquely does.

== Process ==
The part of the overall process which is radically different from most other forms of long-range planning is the central section, the actual production of the scenarios. As derived from the approach most commonly used by Shell, it follows six steps:

1. Decide drivers for change/assumptions
2. Bring drivers together into a viable framework
3. Produce 7–9 initial mini-scenarios
4. Reduce to 2–3 scenarios
5. Draft the scenarios
6. Identify the issues arising

=== Decide assumptions/drivers for change ===
A similar technique – using 5" by 3" index cards – has also been described (as the 'Snowball Technique'), by Backoff and Nutt, for grouping and evaluating ideas in general.

In addition, as scenarios are a technique for presenting alternative futures, the factors to be included must be genuinely 'variable'. They should be subject to significant alternative outcomes. Factors whose outcome is predictable, but important, should be spelled out in the introduction to the scenarios (since they cannot be ignored). The Important Uncertainties Matrix, as reported by Kees van der Heijden of Shell, is a useful check at this stage.

== Scenario planning compared to other techniques ==
Scenario planning differs from contingency planning, sensitivity analysis and computer simulations.

From the start of the 21^{st} century, computer-supported Morphological Analysis has been employed as an aid in scenario development by the Swedish Defence Research Agency in Stockholm. This method makes it possible to create a multi-variable morphological field which can be treated as an inference model – thus integrating scenario planning techniques with contingency analysis and sensitivity analysis.

=== Scenario analysis ===
Scenario analysis is a process of analyzing future events by considering alternative possible outcomes (sometimes called "alternative worlds"). Thus, scenario analysis, which is one of the main forms of projection, does not try to show one exact picture of the future. Instead, it presents several alternative future developments. Consequently, a scope of possible future outcomes is observable. Not only are the outcomes observable, also the development paths leading to the outcomes. In contrast to prognoses, the scenario analysis is not based on extrapolation of the past or the extension of past trends. It does not rely on historical data and does not expect past observations to remain valid in the future. Instead, it tries to consider possible developments and turning points, which may only be connected to the past. In short, several scenarios are fleshed out in a scenario analysis to show possible future outcomes. Each scenario normally combines optimistic, pessimistic, and more and less probable developments. However, all aspects of scenarios should be plausible. Although highly discussed, experience has shown that around three scenarios are most appropriate for further discussion and selection. More scenarios risks making the analysis overly complicated. Scenarios are often confused with other tools and approaches to planning.

==== Principle ====
Numerous researchers have stressed that both approaches are best suited to be combined. Due to their process similarity, the two methodologies can be easily combined. The output of the different phases of the Delphi method can be used as input for the scenario method and vice versa. A combination makes a realization of the benefits of both tools possible. In practice, usually one of the two tools is considered the dominant methodology and the other one is added on at some stage.

The variant that is most often found in practice is the integration of the Delphi method into the scenario process (see e.g. Rikkonen, 2005; von der Gracht, 2008;). Authors refer to this type as Delphi-scenario (writing), expert-based scenarios, or Delphi panel derived scenarios. Von der Gracht (2010) is a scientifically valid example of this method. Since scenario planning is “information hungry”, Delphi research can deliver valuable input for the process. There are various types of information output of Delphi that can be used as input for scenario planning. Researchers can, for example, identify relevant events or developments and, based on expert opinion, assign probabilities to them. Moreover, expert comments and arguments provide deeper insights into relationships of factors that can, in turn, be integrated into scenarios afterwards. Also, Delphi helps to identify extreme opinions and dissent among the experts. Such controversial topics are particularly suited for extreme scenarios or wildcards.

In his doctoral thesis, Rikkonen (2005) examined the utilization of Delphi techniques in scenario planning and, concretely, in construction of scenarios. The author comes to the conclusion that the Delphi technique has instrumental value in providing different alternative futures and the argumentation of scenarios. It is therefore recommended to use Delphi in order to make the scenarios more profound and to create confidence in scenario planning. Further benefits lie in the simplification of the scenario writing process and the deep understanding of the interrelations between the forecast items and social factors.

== Critique ==
“Scenario analysis” is no substitute for complete and factual exposure of survey error in economic studies. In traditional prediction, given the data used to model the problem, with a reasoned specification and technique, an analyst can state, within a certain percentage of statistical error, the likelihood of a coefficient being within a certain numerical bound. This exactitude need not come at the expense of very disaggregated statements of hypotheses. R Software, specifically the module “WhatIf,”

Another challenge of scenario-building is that "predictors are part of the social context about which they are trying to make a prediction and may influence that context in the process".

=== Critique of Shell's use of scenario planning ===
In the 1970s, many energy companies were surprised by both environmentalism and the OPEC cartel, and thereby lost billions of dollars of revenue by misinvestment. The dramatic financial effects of these changes led at least one organization, Royal Dutch Shell, to implement scenario planning. The analysts of this company publicly estimated that this planning process made their company the largest in the world.

The use of scenarios was audited by Arie de Geus's team in the early 1980s; they found that the decision-making processes following the scenarios were the primary cause of the lack of strategic implementation, rather than the scenarios themselves. Many practitioners today spend as much time on the decision-making process as on creating the scenarios themselves.

== See also ==
- Decentralized planning (economics)
- Hoshin Kanri#Hoshin planning
- Futures studies
- Global Scenario Group
- Jim Dator (Hawaii Research Center for Futures Studies)
- Robust decision-making
- Scenario (computing)

=== Analogous concepts ===
- Delphi method,
- Game theory
- Horizon scanning
- Rational choice theory
- Stress testing
- Twelve leverage points

== Additional Bibliography ==
- D. Erasmus, The future of ICT in financial services: The Rabobank ICT scenarios (2008).
- M. Godet, Scenarios and Strategic Management, Butterworths (1987).
- M. Godet, From Anticipation to Action: A Handbook of Strategic Prospective. Paris: Unesco, (1993).
- Adam Kahane, Solving Tough Problems: An Open Way of Talking, Listening, and Creating New Realities (2007)
- H. Kahn, The Year 2000, Calman-Levy (1967).
- Herbert Meyer, "Real World Intelligence", Weidenfeld & Nicolson, 1987,
- National Intelligence Council (NIC), "Mapping the Global Future", 2005,
- M. Lindgren & H. Bandhold, Scenario planning – the link between future and strategy, Palgrave Macmillan, 2003
- G. Wright& G. Cairns, Scenario thinking: practical approaches to the future, Palgrave Macmillan, 2011
- A. Schuehly, F. Becker t& F. Klein, Real Time Strategy: When Strategic Foresight Meets Artificial Intelligence, Emerald, 2020*
- A. Ruser, Sociological Quasi-Labs: The Case for Deductive Scenario Development, Current Sociology Vol63(2): 170-181, https://journals.sagepub.com/doi/pdf/10.1177/0011392114556581

== Scientific journals ==
- Foresight
- Futures
- Futures & Foresight Science
- Journal of Futures Studies
- Technological Forecasting and Social Change
