= Observations, systematical and geographical, on the herbarium collected by Professor Christian Smith, in the vicinity of the Congo =

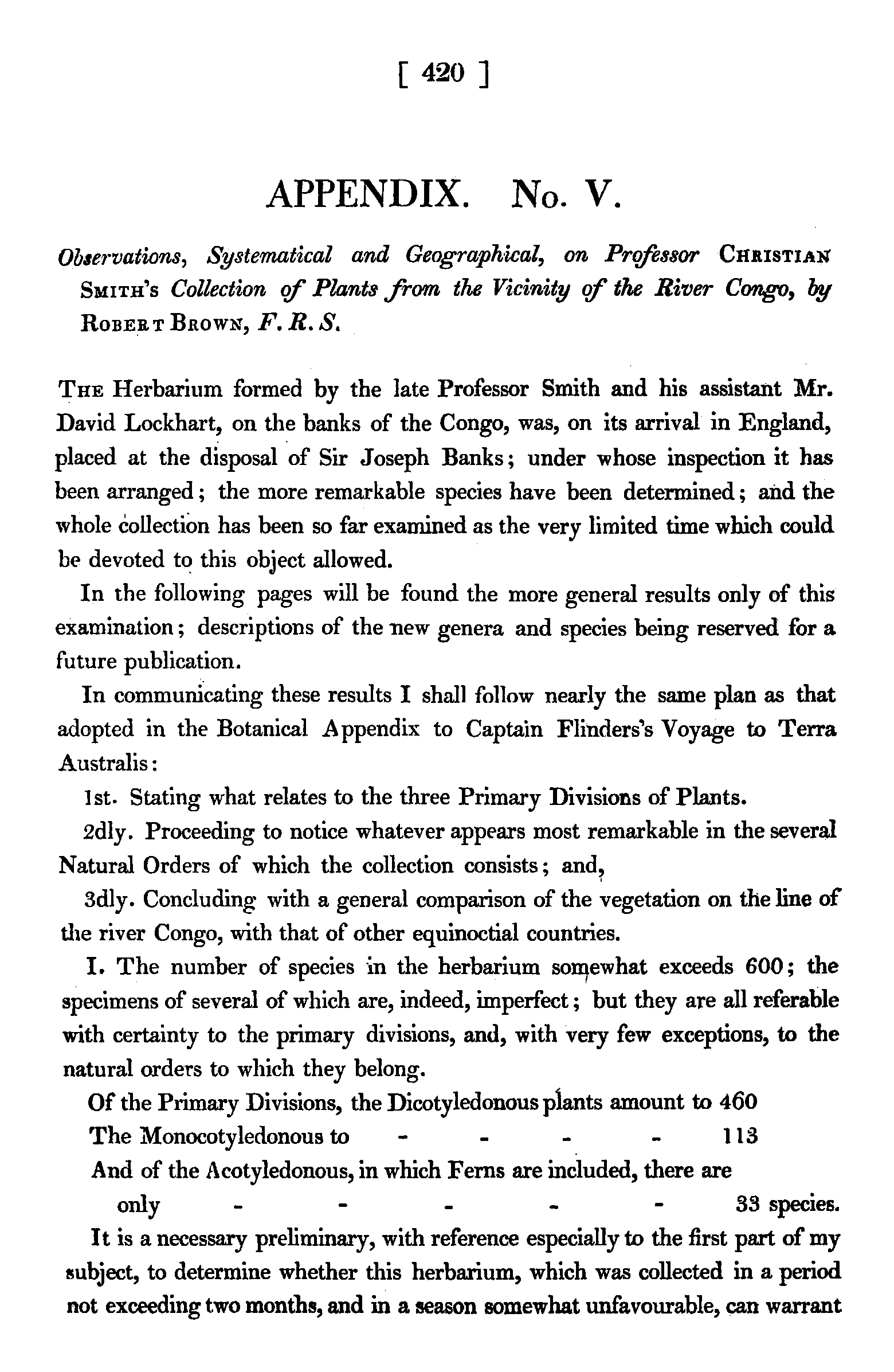
First page of the original publication as Appendix V of James Hingston Tuckey's Narrative of an expedition to explore the River Zaire

Observations, systematical and geographical, on the herbarium collected by Professor Christian Smith, in the vicinity of the Congo, during the expedition to explore that river, under the command of Captain Tuckey, in the year 1816, also published as Observations, systematical and geographical, on Professor Christian Smith's collection of plants from the vicinity of the River Congo, is an 1818 paper written by Robert Brown on the botany of tropical Africa. It is significant for its contributions to plant systematics, and to African floristics and phytogeography.

== Background ==
In 1816, an exploration party under the command of James Hingston Tuckey was sent to Africa to establish whether the stretches of river then named the Niger River and the Congo River were one river or two. The expedition failed dismally: within a few months of reaching the river, many of the party were dead, including Tuckey and the expedition botanist Christen Smith (also known as Christian Smith and Chetian Smith). The botanical assistant, David Lockhart, survived, and eventually returned a collection of around 600 plant species to Joseph Banks. Banks turned the collection over to Brown to arrange it, and see what might be published based on it.

Brown compiled a small flora, preparing several hundred names for publication, but the manuscript was never published, and only a few names were published elsewhere. However, Brown also prepared a paper of more general observations. Entitled Observations, systematical and geographical, on the herbarium collected by Professor Christian Smith, in the vicinity of the Congo, during the expedition to explore that river, under the command of Captain Tuckey, in the year 1816, this appeared first as Appendix V of the official account of Tuckey's expedition, published posthumously under Tuckey's name in 1818, as Narrative of an expedition to explore the River Zaire.

== Content ==
The organisation of Brown's Congo, as it became known at the time, follows that of his earlier essay on the flora of Australia, General remarks, geographical and systematical, on the botany of Terra Australis. It begins with remarks on the floristic composition of the collection, considering the relative proportions of monocots to dicots, and comparing the floristic richness with that of other equatorial regions.

Brown then discusses each family represented in the collection, in the process splitting up Bernard de Jussieu's Terebinthaceae, and publishing for the first time Connaraceae, Oxalidaceae, Chailletiaceae (now included in Dichapetalaceae), Chrysobalanaceae, Homaliaceae (now included in Salicaceae), Hydrophyllaceae (now Hydrophylloideae) and Phytolaccaceae. Melastomataceae is given an accurate circumscription, as is Berberidaceae, despite this family not occurring in central Africa. Brown also names and roughly identifies Loganiaceae, though formal publication would have to wait for Carl Friedrich Philipp von Martius in 1827. Of these remarks on the systematics of various families, David Mabberley has claimed "the observations are of immense value to botanists and of almost breathtaking insight."

The paper concludes with comparisons of the vegetation of the Congo with those of West Africa, South Africa, St. Helena and Madagascar; West Africa is found to be very much similar, and South Africa remarkably different. Comparisons are then made with South America, and consideration is given to how certain distributions might have come about. Noting that the collection contains around 250 new species and about 32 new genera, yet no new family, Brown concludes with the observation that there are no plant families endemic to tropical Africa.

== Reception ==
Initial reception of Brown's Congo was divided. The Quarterly Review praised it, describing it as "highly ingenious and interesting. Indeed [it] is arranged in so clear and perspicuous a manner, is so abundant in facts and philosophical reasoning, and displays such depth of research, as will, we think, establish his character as the first botanist of the age." However, Brown's use of the Natural System was regretted.

On the other hand, Richard Salisbury, Brown's enemy and persona non grata in botanical circles, published a stinging review in the Monthly Review, opening with the claim that Brown's success was due to his "exclusive advantages" as Banks' librarian, "rather than any natural predilection for botany", and going on to declare "Mr. B's chief delight has been to express his meaning in the greatest number of words", and poking fun at Brown's over-use of the word remarkable. Salisbury then summarises Brown's observations, rejecting or mocking as insignificant or unoriginal virtually all of his findings.

== Publication history ==
The work has appeared in the following publications:

- Brown, Robert (1818). "Appendix V: Observations, systematical and geographical, on the herbarium collected by Professor Christian Smith, in the vicinity of the Congo, during the expedition to explore that river, under the command of Captain Tuckey, in the year 1816". Narrative of an expedition to explore the River Zaire. pp. 420–485.
- Brown, Robert (1818). Observations, systematical and geographical, on the herbarium collected by Professor Christian Smith, in the vicinity of the Congo, during the expedition to explore that river, under the command of Captain Tuckey, in the year 1816. (a separately published offprint)
- Brown, Robert (1866). "Observations, systematical and geographical, on the herbarium collected by Professor Christian Smith, in the vicinity of the Congo, during the expedition to explore that river, under the command of Captain Tuckey, in the year 1816". In Bennett, John Joseph (ed.). The miscellaneous botanical works of Robert Brown, Esq., D.C.L., F.R.S. Vol. 1. pp. 97–173.

Tuckey's book, including Brown's appendix, was translated into French, and a German translation later appeared in Christian Gottfried Daniel Nees von Esenbeck's 1827 Robert Brown's Vermischte botanische Schriften.
