= Christen Smith =

Norwegian botanist (1785–1816)

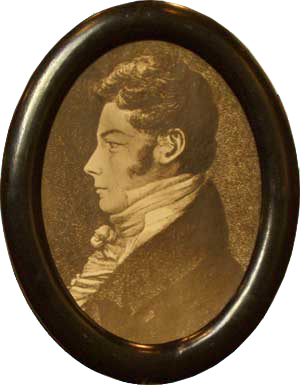
- Christen Smith portrait, ca 1810
- Born: 17 October 1785; Skoger, Norway
- Died: 22 September 1816 (aged 30); Tall Trees, at the Congo River
- Scientific career
- Fields: Botany, geology
- Workplaces: Natural History Museum, Oslo
- Author abbrev. (botany): C.Sm.

Christen Smith (17 October 1785 – 22 September 1816) also known as Christian Smith or Chretien Smith, was an early 19th-century Norwegian physician, economist and naturalist, particularly botanist. He died, only 30 years old during a dramatic expedition to the Congo River in 1816, leaving a wealth of botanical material.

== Early years ==
Smith was born at Skoger in what is now Drammen, Norway. He studied medicine and botany at the University of Copenhagen under Professor Martin Vahl. Together with Jens Wilken Hornemann, he traveled through large parts of Norway and carried out botanical investigations, collecting plants to be included in the plate work Flora Danica. Joakim Frederik Schouw and Morten Wormskjold were in the company for part of the trip. The party climbed several mountain tops in Jotunheimen, for some of which it was the first recorded ascent, e.g. Bitihorn 1811 and Hårteigen 1812.

== The Canary and Madeira expeditions ==
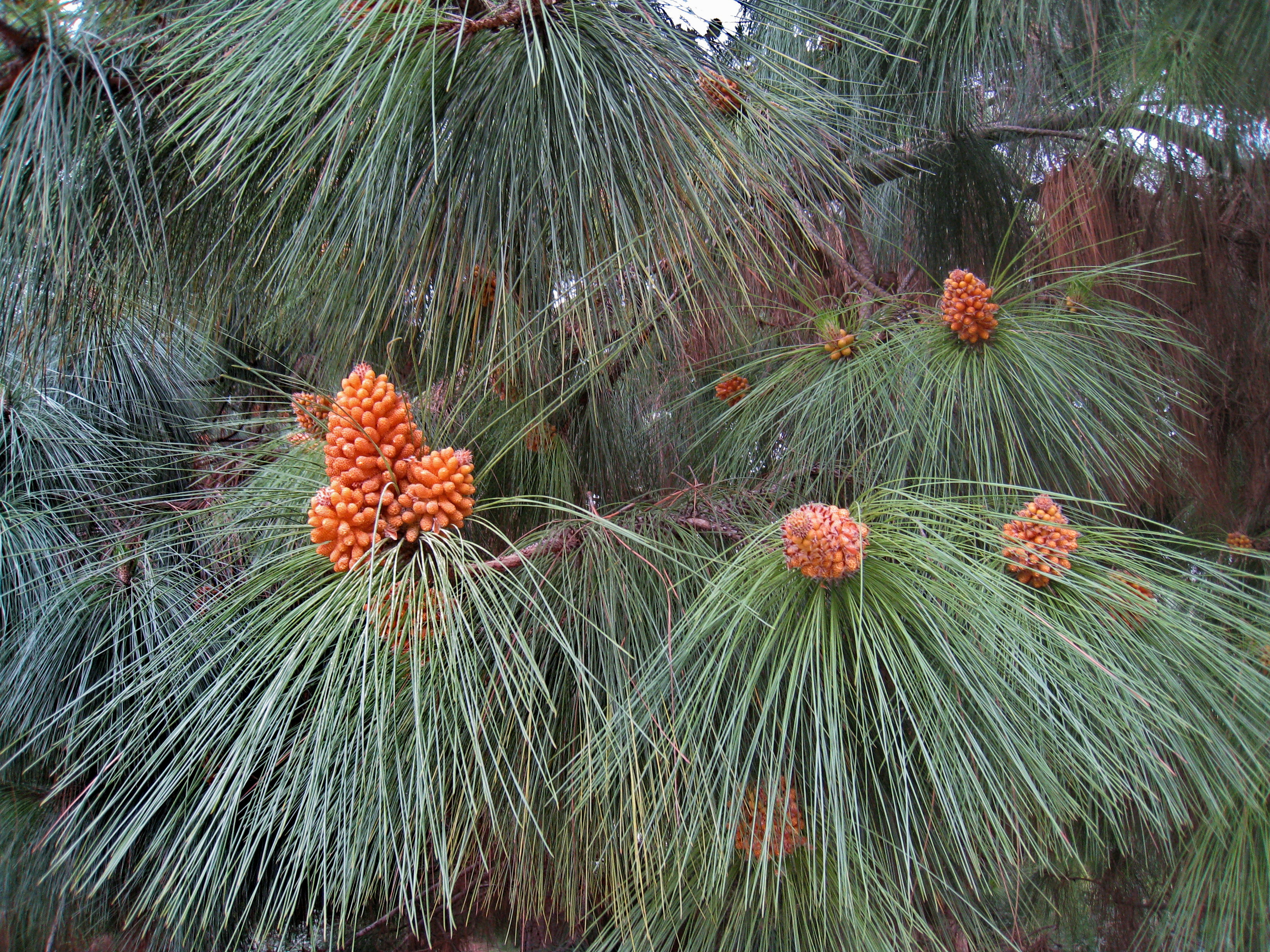
The long-needled Canary Island pine, described as a new species by Smith

In 1808, Smith graduated and started to practice medicine in Norway. In 1814, he was appointed professor of national economy and botany at the newly founded Royal Frederick University in Christiania (now Oslo). However, he never took up the position as he embarked upon travels abroad to establish contacts and keep abreast of the development of botanical gardens in Europe. His first journey took him to Scotland and from there to London, where he met the Prussian geologist Leopold von Buch. Buch planned to visit the volcanic Canary Islands and Madeira, and Smith eagerly seized the opportunity to participate in an expedition with the experienced scientist. In 1815, the two embarked on the trip. They returned to Portsmouth on 8 December that year, Smith bringing 600 species of plants, of which about 50 were new to science. The best known of Smith's new species is probably Pinus canariensis, the Canary Island pine.

== Death on the Congo ==
Having learned geology from Buch in addition to discovering new plant species, Smith was approached by the Royal Society of London and asked to participate in a scientific expedition under Captain James Hingston Tuckey to determine whether the Congo River had any connection to the Niger basins of western and central Africa. Smith was to function as the expedition's botanist and geologist. He had as assistant David Lockhart, who was to survive the journey.

The Congo expedition began in February 1816 and went badly from the start. The original plan was to sail up the river using the expedition ship "HMS Congo", which had originally been constructed as a steamboat, a technology that was still in its infancy. While the ship was eventually rigged for conventional sails, the heavy construction made it sit deep in the water. The accompanying lighter vessel "Dorothy" was also used but was stopped by rapids 160 km inland. The expedition continued on foot up along the Congo through mosquito-infested swamps. The expedition advanced 450 kilometres up the river, but lack of food, hostile natives and ravaging tropical fevers forced the expedition to turn back without having found the sought connection. On the way downriver, Smith caught a tropical fever (probably yellow fever) and died, less than a month shy of his 31st birthday. In all, 18 of the 56 members of the expedition perished, including all the scientists and the captain, who died after returning to the ship. The ill-fated expedition was part of the inspiration for Joseph Conrad's Heart of Darkness, written almost a century later.

== Smith's legacy ==
Before succumbing to fever, Captain Tuckey made sure that Smith's diary and plant specimens were shipped to London. His collection from the trip consisted of 620 species, of which 250 proved to be new to science but had to be published by other botanists. Several of the texts he left behind were later published by his friend Martin Richard Flor.

Many species of plants have been named after Smith, e.g., Aeonium smithii (Sims) Webb & Berthel. (1840) from Tenerife and the genus Christiana (Malvaceae: Brownlowioideae), discovered in Congo by Smith and described by Augustin Pyramus de Candolle in his Prodromus systematis naturalis regni vegetabilis (1824).

The swallow Hirundo smithii, and a species of snake, Grayia smythii, are named in honor of Christen Smith.

== See also ==
- Observations, systematical and geographical, on the herbarium collected by Professor Christian Smith, in the vicinity of the Congo
- Media related to Christen Smith at Wikimedia Commons
