= Robert Brown (botanist, born 1773) =

Scottish botanist (1773–1858)

The Right Honourable Robert Brown FRS FRSE FLS MWS.
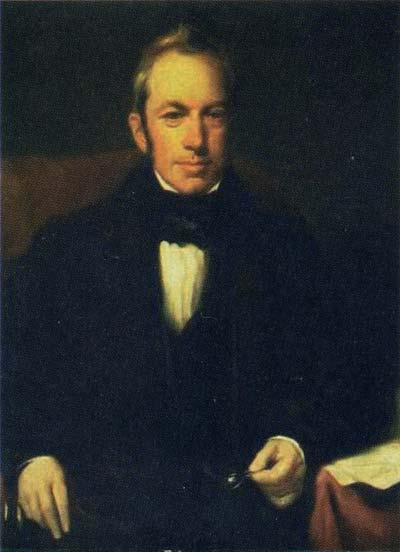
- Portrait by Henry William Pickersgill
- Born: 21 December 1773; Montrose, Scotland
- Died: 10 June 1858 (aged 84); London, England
- Education: University of Aberdeen University of Edinburgh
- Known for: Brownian motion, Prodromus Florae Novae Hollandiae et Insulae Van Diemen
- Parents: James Brown (father); Helen Brown, née Taylor (mother)
- Scientific career
- Fields: Botany
- Workplaces: British Museum
- Author abbrev. (botany): R.Br.

Robert Brown FRSE FRS FLS MWS (21 December 1773 – 10 June 1858) was a Scottish botanist and paleobotanist who made important contributions to botany largely through his pioneering use of the microscope. His contributions include one of the earliest detailed descriptions of the cell nucleus and cytoplasmic streaming; the observation of Brownian motion; early work on plant pollination and fertilisation, including being the first to recognise the fundamental difference between gymnosperms and angiosperms; and some of the earliest studies in palynology. He also made numerous contributions to plant taxonomy, notably erecting a number of plant families that are still accepted today; and numerous Australian plant genera and species, the fruit of his exploration of that continent with Matthew Flinders.

The standard author abbreviation R.Br. is used to indicate this person as the author when citing a botanical name.

== Early life ==
Robert Brown was born in Montrose, Scotland on 21 December 1773, in a house that existed on the site where Montrose Library currently stands. He was the son of James Brown, a minister in the Scottish Episcopal Church with Jacobite convictions so strong that in 1788 he defied his church's decision to give allegiance to George III. His mother was Helen Brown née Taylor, the daughter of a Presbyterian minister. As a child Brown attended the local Grammar School (now called Montrose Academy), then Marischal College at Aberdeen, but withdrew in his fourth year when the family moved to Edinburgh in 1790. His father died late the following year.

Brown enrolled to study medicine at the University of Edinburgh, but developed an interest in botany and ended up spending more of his time on the latter than the former. He attended the lectures of John Walker; made botanical expeditions into the Scottish Highlands, alone or with nurserymen such as George Don; and wrote out meticulous botanical descriptions of the plants he collected. He also began corresponding with and collecting for William Withering, one of the foremost British botanists of his day. Highlights for Brown during this period include his discovery of a new species of grass, Alopecurus alpinus, and his first botanical paper, "The botanical history of Angus", read to the Edinburgh Natural History Society in January 1792 but not published in print in Brown's lifetime.

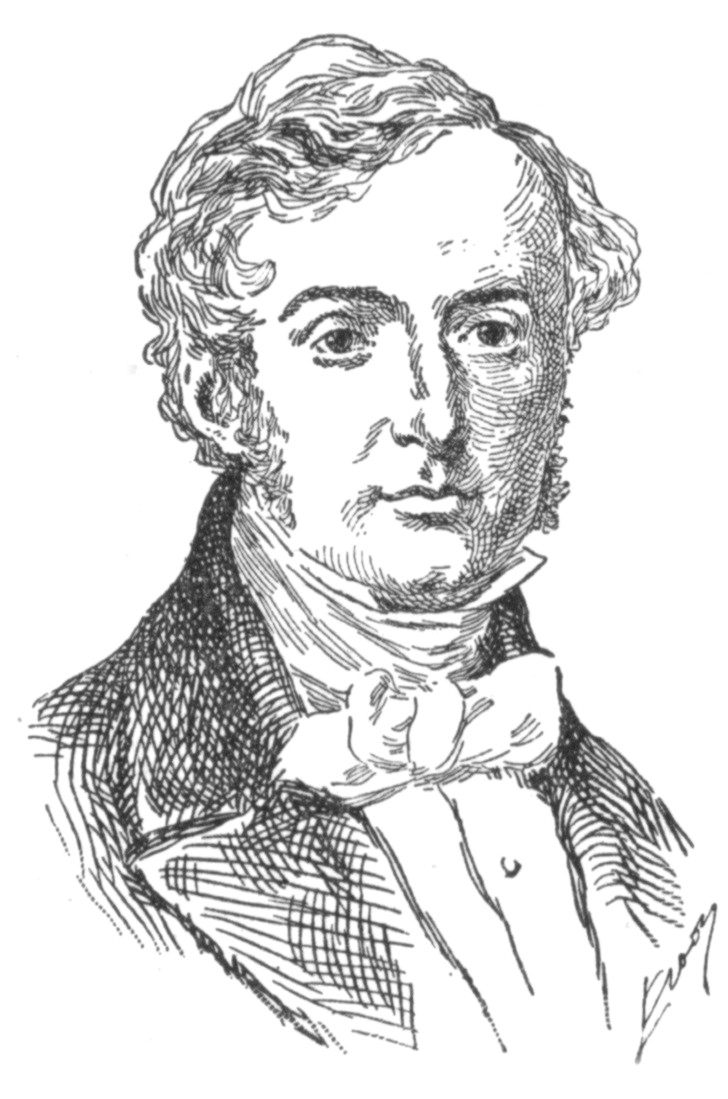
Brown as a young man

Brown dropped out of his medical course in 1793. Late in 1794 he enlisted in the Fifeshire Fencibles, and his regiment was posted to Ireland shortly after. In June 1795 he was appointed Surgeon's Mate. His regiment saw very little action and he had a good deal of leisure time, almost all of which he spent on botany. He was frustrated by his itinerant lifestyle, which prevented him from building his personal library and specimen collection as he would have liked, and cut him off from the most important herbaria and libraries.

During this period Brown was especially interested in cryptogams, and these would be the subject of Brown's first, albeit unattributed, publication. Brown began a correspondence with James Dickson, and by 1796 was sending him specimens and descriptions of mosses. Dickson incorporated Brown's descriptions into his Fasciculi plantarum cryptogamicarum britanniae, with Brown's permission but without any attribution.

By 1800 Brown was firmly established amongst Irish botanists and was corresponding with a number of British and foreign botanists, including Withering, Dickson, James Edward Smith and José Correia da Serra. He had been nominated to the Linnean Society of London; had contributed to Dickson's Fasciculi; was acknowledged in a number of other works; and had had a species of algae, Conferva brownii (now Aegagropila linnaei) named after him by Lewis Weston Dillwyn. He had also begun experimenting with microscopy. However, as an army surgeon stationed in Ireland there seemed little prospect of him attracting the notice of those who could offer him a career in botany.

== To Australia on the Investigator ==
In 1798 Brown heard that Mungo Park had withdrawn from a proposed expedition into the interior of New Holland (now Australia), leaving a vacancy for a naturalist. At Brown's request, Correia wrote to Joseph Banks, suggesting Brown as a suitable replacement:

Science is the gainer in this change of man; Mr Brown being a professed naturalist. He is a Scotchman, fit to pursue an object with constance and cold mind.

He was not selected, and the expedition did not end up going ahead as originally proposed, though George Caley was sent to New South Wales as a botanical collector for Banks. In 1800, however, Matthew Flinders put to Banks a proposal for an expedition that would answer the question whether New Holland was one island or several. Banks approved Flinders' proposal, and in December 1800 wrote to Brown offering him the position of naturalist to the expedition. Brown accepted immediately.

=== Preparations ===
Brown was told to expect to sail at the end of 1800, only a few weeks after being offered the position. A succession of delays meant the voyage did not get under way until July 1801. Brown spent much of the meantime preparing for the voyage by studying Banks' Australian plant specimens and copying out notes and descriptions for use on the voyage.

Though Brown's brief was to collect scientific specimens of all sorts, he was told to give priority to plants, insects, and birds, and to treat other fields, such as geology, as secondary pursuits. In addition to Brown, the scientific staff comprised the renowned botanical illustrator Ferdinand Bauer; the gardener Peter Good, whose task was to collect live plants and viable seed for the use of Kew Gardens; the miner John Allen, appointed as mineralogist; the landscape artist William Westall; and the astronomer John Crosley, who would fall ill on the voyage out and leave the ship at the Cape of Good Hope, being belatedly replaced at Sydney by James Inman. Brown was given authority over Bauer and Good, both of whom were instructed to give any specimens they might collect to Brown, rather than forming separate collections. Both men would provide enthusiastic and hard-working companions for Brown, and thus Brown's specimen collections contain material collected by all three men.

=== Desertas, Madeira and the Cape of Good Hope ===
HMS Investigator sailed from London on 18 July. They made brief landfalls at Bugio Island (Desertas Islands) and Madeira, but Brown was disappointed to collect almost nothing of note from either site. They arrived at the Cape of Good Hope on 16 October, staying a little over two weeks, during which time Brown made extensive botanical expeditions and climbed Table Mountain at least twice. Many years later he would write to William Henry Harvey, who was considering emigrating there, that "some of the pleasantest botanizing he ever had was on Devil's Mountain, near Cape Town, and he thought I could not pitch on a more delightful field of study." Amongst the plants collected at the cape were two new species of Serruria (Proteaceae), S. foeniculacea and S. flagellaris.

=== Australia ===
Investigator arrived in King George Sound in what is now Western Australia in December 1801. For three and a half years Brown did intensive botanic research in Australia, collecting about 3400 species, of which about 2000 were previously unknown. A large part of this collection was lost when Porpoise was wrecked en route to England.

Brown remained in Australia until May 1805. He then returned to Britain where he spent the next five years working on the material he had gathered. He published numerous species descriptions; in Western Australia alone he is the author of nearly 1200 species. The list of major Australian genera that he named includes: Livistona, Triodia, Eriachne, Caladenia, Isolepis, Prasophyllum, Pterostylis, Patersonia, Conostylis, Thysanotus, Pityrodia, Hemigenia, Lechenaultia, Eremophila, Logania, Dryandra, Isopogon, Grevillea, Petrophile, Telopea, Leptomeria, Jacksonia, Leucopogon, Stenopetalum, Ptilotus, Sclerolaena and Rhagodia.

== Subsequent career ==
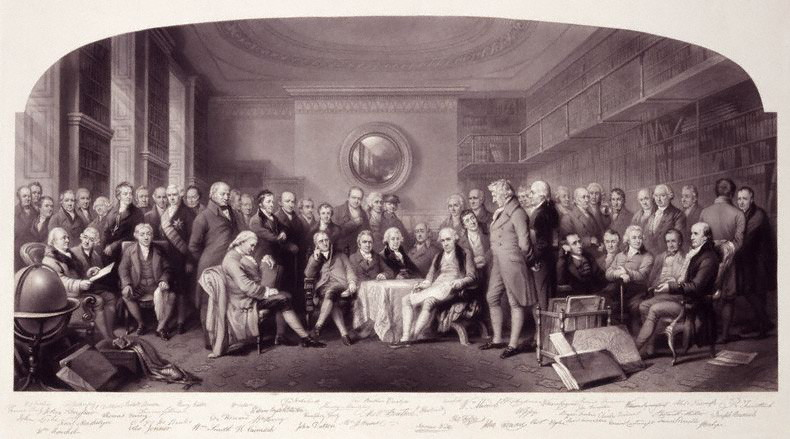
Distinguished Men of Science. Use the cursor to see who is who.

In early 1809 he read his paper called On the natural order of plants called Proteaceae to the Linnean Society of London. This was subsequently published in March 1810 as On the Proteaceae of Jussieu. It is significant for its contribution to the systematics of Proteaceae, and to the floristics of Australia, and also for its application of palynology to systematics. This work was extensively plagiarised by Richard Anthony Salisbury, who had memorised much of the Linnean reading and then inserted it in Joseph Knight's 1809 publication On the cultivation of the plants belonging to the natural order of Proteeae.

In 1810, he published the results of his collecting in his famous Prodromus Florae Novae Hollandiae et Insulae Van Diemen, the first systematic account of the Australian flora. Over half of New Zealand's orchid genera were first described in the work. That year, he succeeded Jonas C. Dryander as Joseph Banks' librarian, and on Banks' death in 1820 Brown inherited his library and herbarium. This was transferred to the British Museum in 1827, and Brown was appointed Keeper of the Banksian Botanical Collection.

In 1818 he published Observations, systematical and geographical, on the herbarium collected by Professor Christian Smith, in the vicinity of the Congo. In 1822, he was elected a Fellow of the Linnean Society and a foreign member of the Royal Swedish Academy of Sciences. In 1827 he became correspondent of the Royal Institute of the Netherlands, three years later he became associated member. When the institute became the Royal Netherlands Academy of Arts and Sciences in 1851 Brown joined as foreign member. He was elected a Foreign Honorary Member of the American Academy of Arts and Sciences in 1849.

Brown was one of the seven founding members of the Royal Geographical Society which formed on 16 July 1830.

In a paper read to the Linnean society in 1831 and published in 1833, Brown named the cell nucleus. The nucleus had been observed before, perhaps as early as 1682 by the Dutch microscopist Leeuwenhoek, and Franz Bauer had noted and drawn it as a regular feature of plant cells in 1802, but it was Brown who gave it the name it bears to this day (while giving credit to Bauer's drawings). Neither Bauer nor Brown thought the nucleus to be universal, and Brown thought it to be primarily confined to Monocotyledons.

After the division of the Natural History Department of the British Museum into three sections in 1837, Robert Brown became the first Keeper of the Botanical Department, remaining so until his death. He was succeeded by John Joseph Bennett.

He served as president of the Linnean Society from 1849 to 1853.

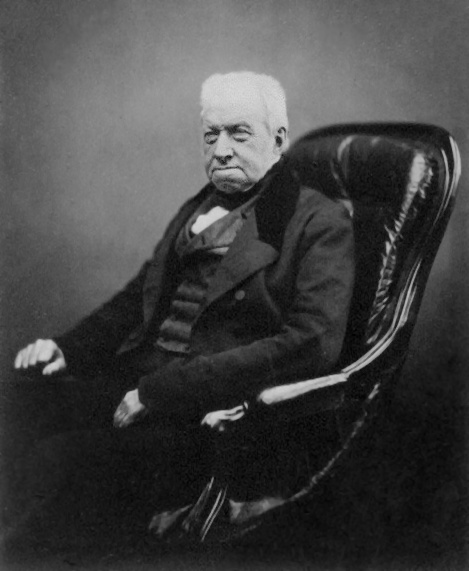
Brown in 1855

Brown died at 17 Dean Street, Soho Square in London, on 10 June 1858. He was buried in Kensal Green Cemetery in London.

== Legacy ==
Brown's name is commemorated in the Australian herb genus Brunonia as well as numerous Australian species such as Eucalyptus brownii, Banksia brownii and the moss Brown's Tetrodontium Moss (Tetrodontium brownianum), a species which he discovered growing at Roslin near Edinburgh whilst still a student. The plant can still be found at the site of its discovery. Brown's River, south of Hobart, upon the banks of which he collected botanical samples, was named in his honour. In South Australia, Mount Brown and Point Brown (near Smoky Bay) were named for him by Flinders during the Investigator expedition. Mount Brown in British Columbia, Canada was named for him by David Douglas.

In 1938 the London County Council commemorated Brown, as well as botanists Joseph Banks and David Don, and meetings of the Linnean Society, with a rectangular stone plaque at 32 Soho Square.

A small New Zealand tree Pisonia brunoniana was named in recognition of him, and Cape Brown (Greenland) was named by William Scoresby (1789–1857) in 1822 in his honour. Specimens collected by Brown are cared for at the National Herbarium of Victoria (MEL), Royal Botanic Gardens Victoria.

== Brownian motion ==
In 1827, while examining grains of pollen of the plant Clarkia pulchella suspended in water under a microscope, Brown observed minute particles, now known to be amyloplasts (starch organelles) and spherosomes (lipid organelles), ejected from the pollen grains, executing a continuous jittery motion. He then observed the same motion in particles of inorganic matter, enabling him to rule out the hypothesis that the effect was life-related. Although Brown did not provide a theory to explain the motion, the phenomenon is now known as Brownian motion.

In recent years controversy arose over whether Brown's microscopes were sufficient to reveal phenomena of this order. Brown's discoveries were denied in a brief paper in 1991. Shortly thereafter, in an illustrated presentation, British microscopist Brian J. Ford presented to Inter Micro 1991 in Chicago a reprise of the demonstration using Brown's original microscope. His video sequences substantiated Brown's observations, suggesting Brown's microscope was sufficient to allow him to see motion. Physicist Phil Pearle and colleagues presented a detailed discussion of Brown's original observations of particles from pollen of Clarkia pulchella undergoing Brownian motion, including the relevant history, botany, microscopy, and physics.

== See also ==
- Prodromus Florae Novae Hollandiae et Insulae Van Diemen
- Brown's taxonomic arrangement of Banksia
- List of Australian plant species authored by Robert Brown
- European and American voyages of scientific exploration
- Character and description of Kingia
- Taxa named by Robert Brown

== Sources ==
- Flinders, Matthew (1966) [1814]. A Voyage to Terra Australis: Undertaken for the Purpose of Completing the Discovery of that Vast Country, and Prosecuted in the Years 1801, 1802, and 1803, in His Majesty's Ship the Investigator. Adelaide: Libraries Board of South Australia. LCCN 66070225. OCLC 4565366. OL 38607138M. Wikidata Q133875246.
