= Royal Norwegian Society for Development =

Norwegian development organization

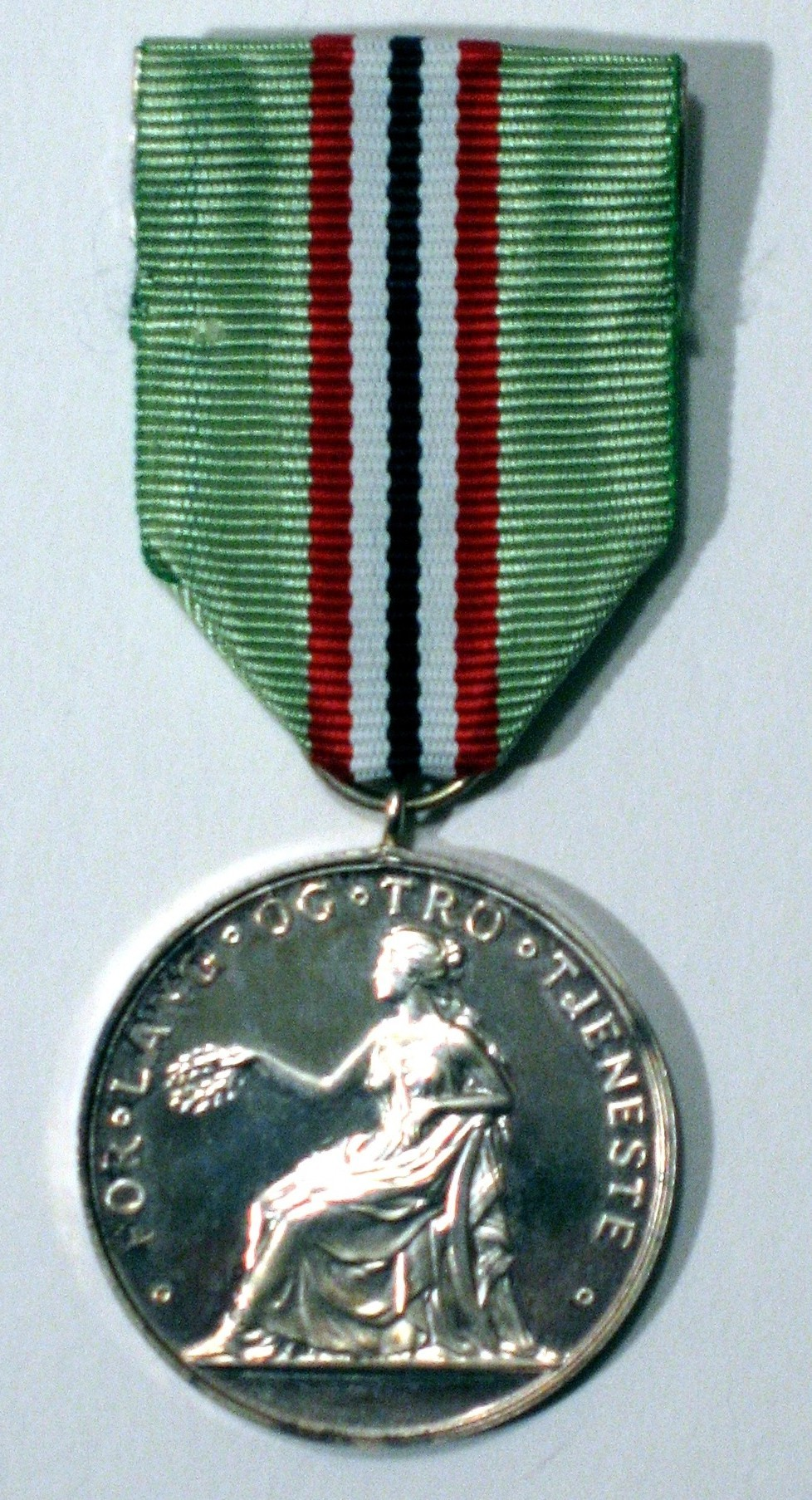

The Royal Norwegian Society for Development (Norwegian: Det Kongelige Selskap for Norges Vel, also known as Norges Vel 'Norwegian Development', originally called Selskabet for Norges Vel 'Norwegian Society for Development') is a general development organization established in 1809 that works to promote viable communities through various forms of business development. The society operates projects in Norway, the Balkans, Latin America, and southern and eastern Africa. The organization, which is ethically based and independent, offers membership to individuals, businesses, and other organizations.

== Activity ==
The society promotes sustainable development in agriculture, marine activities, and renewable energy. Its goal is to promote viable communities, both nationally and internationally. The methods are the same as when it was established in 1809: collaboration, sharing knowledge, and business development. Its focus areas are:

- Project development and project management
- Business development
- Commercial organization
- Collaborative solutions
- Food and experience concepts
- Climate, the environment, and renewable energy
- Research and commercial development
- Entrepreneurship and entrepreneurial services

The society confers the Medal for Long and Faithful Service (Medaljen for lang og tro tjeneste) and the Norwegian Development Entrepreneurship Award (Norges Vels Gründerpris). The organization also distributes funds from the Norwegian Development Fund.

The organization, which has nearly 30 employees, is headquartered in Hellerud in Lillestrøm Municipality outside of Oslo. It also has branch offices in Bergen Municipality and in Levanger Municipality, as well as its own office abroad in Tanzania.

== History ==
The Norwegian Society for Development was created on December 29, 1809, following initiatives by Bishop Frederik Julius Bech, Jacob Rosted, the assessor Peter Collett, Ludvig Stoud Platou, Martin Richard Flor, and Count Herman Wedel Jarlsberg. The society had branch offices in all of the country's largest towns.

Count Wedel Jarlsberg soon saw the political potential of the society, and he made it a union for Norwegian interests in the entire state of Denmark–Norway. In 1810, the society took the initiative to raise funds in support of a Norwegian university in Christiania. This was a national collection effort, and the petition was addressed to King Frederik VI personally. The king eventually agreed, and the University of Oslo was founded in 1811.

Later, Henrik Wergeland used the society as a means to promote public education. The society is responsible for a number of institutions that form part of Norwegian government and industry today. In 1810, it established Norway's first publishing house for printing and distributing its own material. The society operated as a patent office until that activity was taken over by the state in 1885.

By the time that Norway obtained its own constitution in 1814, the society had achieved many of its goals. The company was therefore reorganized a few years later with greater emphasis on agriculture as a means of social development. Like today, the means for this were collaboration, sharing knowledge, and business development. Several agricultural schools were established, and in 1848 the precursor of the Norwegian University of Life Sciences (NMBU) was established. It engaged cattle breeders from Switzerland to teach animal husbandry and dairy farming (hence the expression sveiser 'livestock farmer' < sveitser 'Swiss person'). The society also supplied Norway's first travelling agronomist in 1852. In 1856, Norway's first dairy cooperative, the Rausjødalen Dairy, was established; it is the predecessor of today's company Tine.
