= David Lockhart =

David Lockhart (died 1845) was an English gardener and botanist, one of the few survivors of an 1816 expedition to the River Zaire.

== Life ==
Lockhart was born in Cumberland and became a gardener of the Royal Gardens, Kew. In 1816, he became the assistant of Christen Smith, naturalist to the Congo expedition under James Hingston Tuckey. Lockhart returned alive, but suffering badly from fever, while the expedition's principals and many of the other members died. It was Lockhart who delivered Smith's dried botanical collection to Sir Joseph Banks.

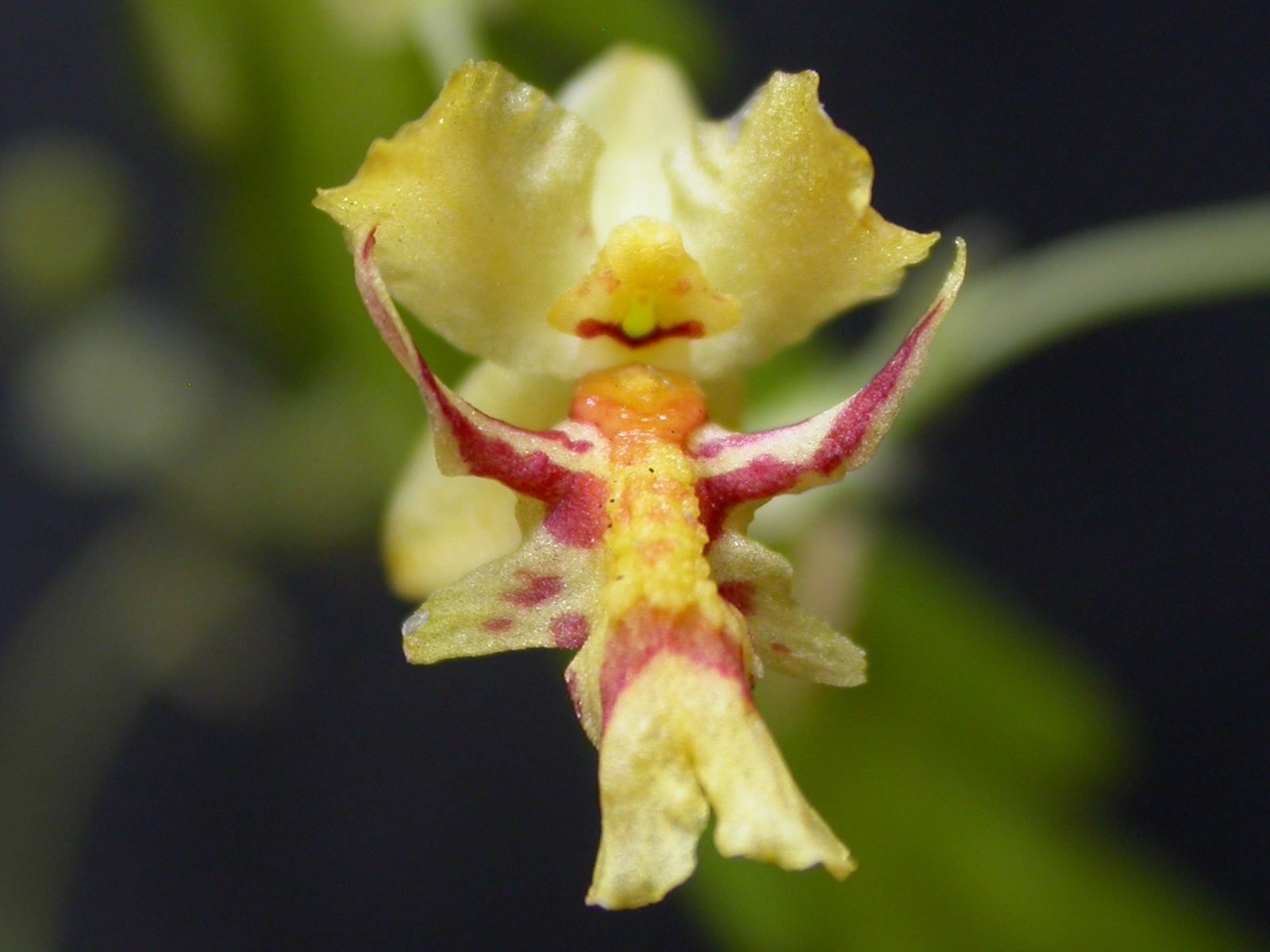
Lockhartia ludibunda

Two years later, Lockhart was put in charge of the Colonial Gardens in Trinidad, then under the supervision of Sir Ralph Woodford. He visited England in 1844 with the view of enriching the Trinidad gardens, but he died in 1845 soon after his return to the island. A genus of orchids, which was named Lockhartia after him by William Jackson Hooker, was merged into Fernandezia, by John Lindley. The "braided orchids", however, as Lockhartia plants are known, are now taken as distinct from Fernandezia.

The standard author abbreviation Lockh. is used to indicate this person as the author when citing a botanical name.
