= Rausjødalen Dairy =

Dairy farm in Tolga, Norway

Coordinates: 62°12′52″N 11°09′10″E

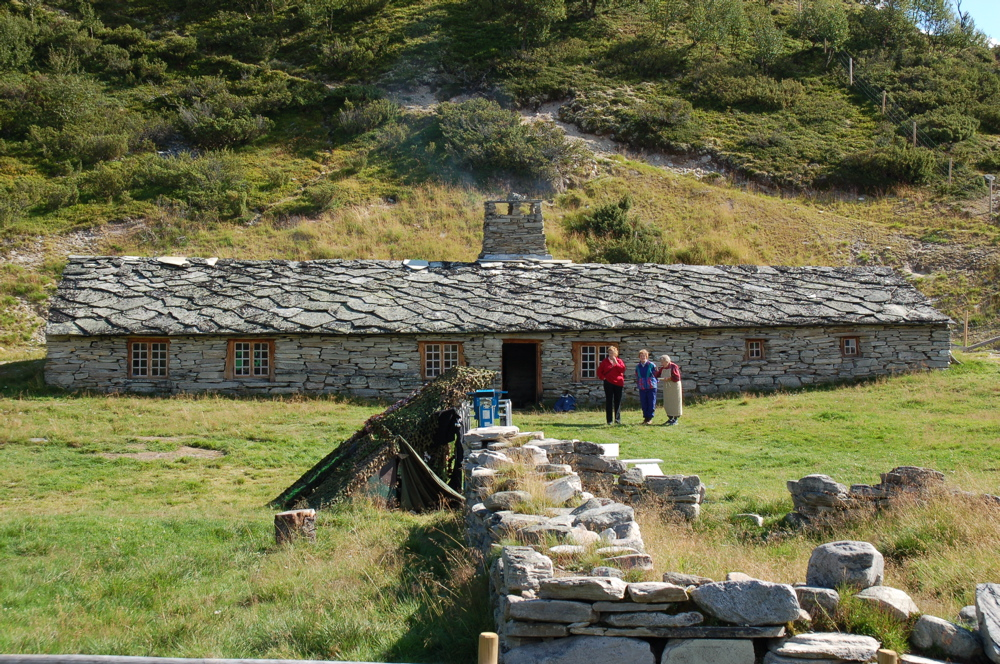
The Rausjødalen Dairy on its 150th anniversary in 2006

The Rausjødalen Dairy (Norwegian: Rausjødalen setermeieri) was Europe's first dairy cooperative north of the Alps. It was built in 1856 in Raudsjødalen (lit. 'the Raudsjø Valley') in Tolga Municipality in Norway. It was originally established under the name Rausjødalen Meieri. It is the predecessor of today's Tine company.

== Background ==
The initiative to start a dairy in the Raudsjø Valley was led by Jon Simensen Grue (1804–1891), a farmer, teacher, and sexton, and Ole Jonsen Berg (1829–1908). The reason for starting a dairy in the mountains was the motivation to process milk and take advantage of the good mountain pasture in the summer to increase profitability. The company was founded on January 24, 1856, with 30 farmers present at the meeting at Tolga. Eventually it had 40 shareholders. The Norwegian Society for Development contributed loans to buy the land where the dairy would be located. The society also had a traveling agronomist, Caspar Holten Jensenius (1821–1902), who helped get the dairy started. The Norwegian Society for Development also obtained a cheese-maker from Switzerland, Caspar Hiestand (1816–1885).

== Construction ==
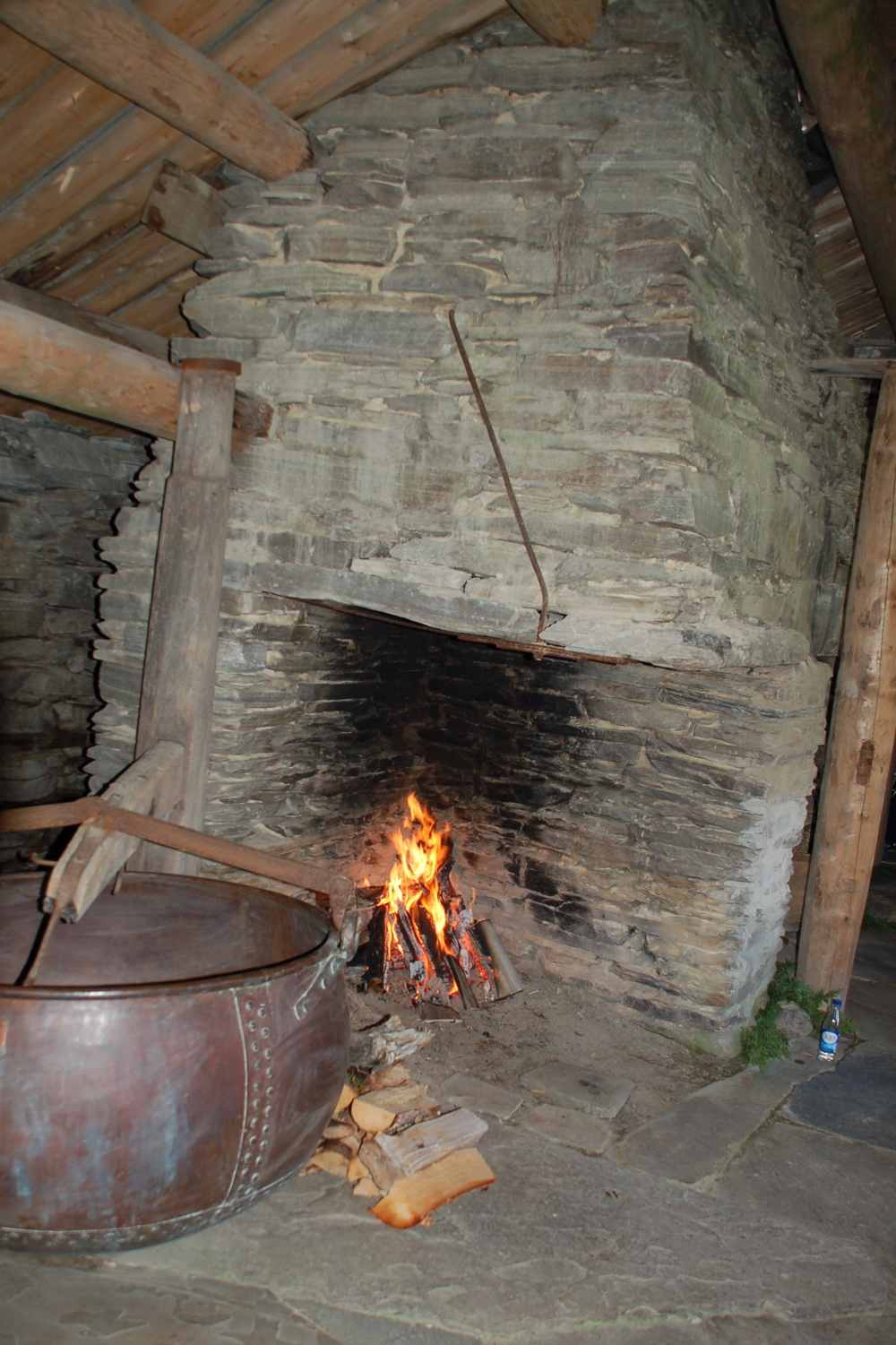
Inside the cheese-making room, with the hearth burning

The Raudsjø Valley lies high in the mountains, at an elevation of 900 meters (3,000 ft), and is difficult to access. Construction began on June 12, 1856. A team of 37 workers and 38 horses stayed for three weeks to build the large stone dairy building. In addition, the dairy was equipped with a barn that could accommodate 100 cattle. In addition to a cheese-making room with an open hearth, the dairy building also had a milk house and a storage room for the finished cheese (an Emmental cheese).

== 1856 operating season ==
There was a strong opposition among many of the farm wives against sending off their cows and leaving their care to strangers. The 1856 season lasted from July 7 to September 15, and 34 shareholders sent 89 cows and two bulls to the dairy. There were some problems at the beginning, but eventually the cheese making worked out well for Hiestand and the nine others caring for the cows and processing the milk. According to the records, the dairy cattle each produced just under 4 liters (0.88 imp gal; 1.1 U.S. gal) of milk per day on average.

Most of the cheese was sold in Christiania, and some in Trondheim, the butter was traded locally, and the whey was distributed among the shareholders. The gross return was 845 specie-dollars, which was considered a good result.

During the winter, Hiestand offered guidance in caring for livestock in the village, for which he received favorable reports.

== 1857 operating season ==
In the summer of 1857, operations at the dairy lasted from July 8 to September 9 and included 91 cows. That summer was cold, but the production was promising nonetheless. However, something failed during storage, and the quality of the cheese was worse than the previous year. This was before the Røros Line was opened, and so transport had to take place by horse to the capital. During transportation the cheese suffered water damage, which ruined its appearance and affected its price.

== Further activity ==
Hiestand left his position in the spring of 1858, and another was scheduled to take over main responsibility, but there were no additional operating seasons at the dairy. First, the shareholders decided take a year's break because the pasturing rights were not in order, and the next year there was a fire in the dairy building. The pastures were then sold to two of the shareholders, Nils Malmåsen and Even Kåsen, and conventional pasture usage continued in the Raudsjø Valley.

== Restoration and anniversary ==
The dairy building itself has been restored several times. Work has also been carried out on the slope behind the dairy, which was slumping and damaging the building. The building is now in good condition. There have been several anniversary celebrations at the dairy, the last one being the 150th anniversary in 2006, when the Tine company held parts of its 125th anniversary at the site. The Rausjødalen Dairy is regarded as the place where Tine has its roots, and it laid the foundation for the development of dairy cooperatives in Norway.

== The dairy today ==
It is possible to drive into the Raudsjø Valley during the summer via a 13-kilometer (8.1 mi) toll road that starts at Brydalen in Tynset Municipality. The Norwegian Trekking Association has an unattended cottage close to the dairy and the mountain pasture, and there are good opportunities for mountain walks in the area. A popular goal for many is Raudsjøpiggen (Raudsjø Peak, 1,306 meters or 4,285 feet). In 2008, the dairy building was reopened for visitors in July, and today it has a small museum with many objects that the landowners have collected with the help of North Østerdalen Museums. Financial support from the Tine company has helped keep the dairy open to the public since 2009.
