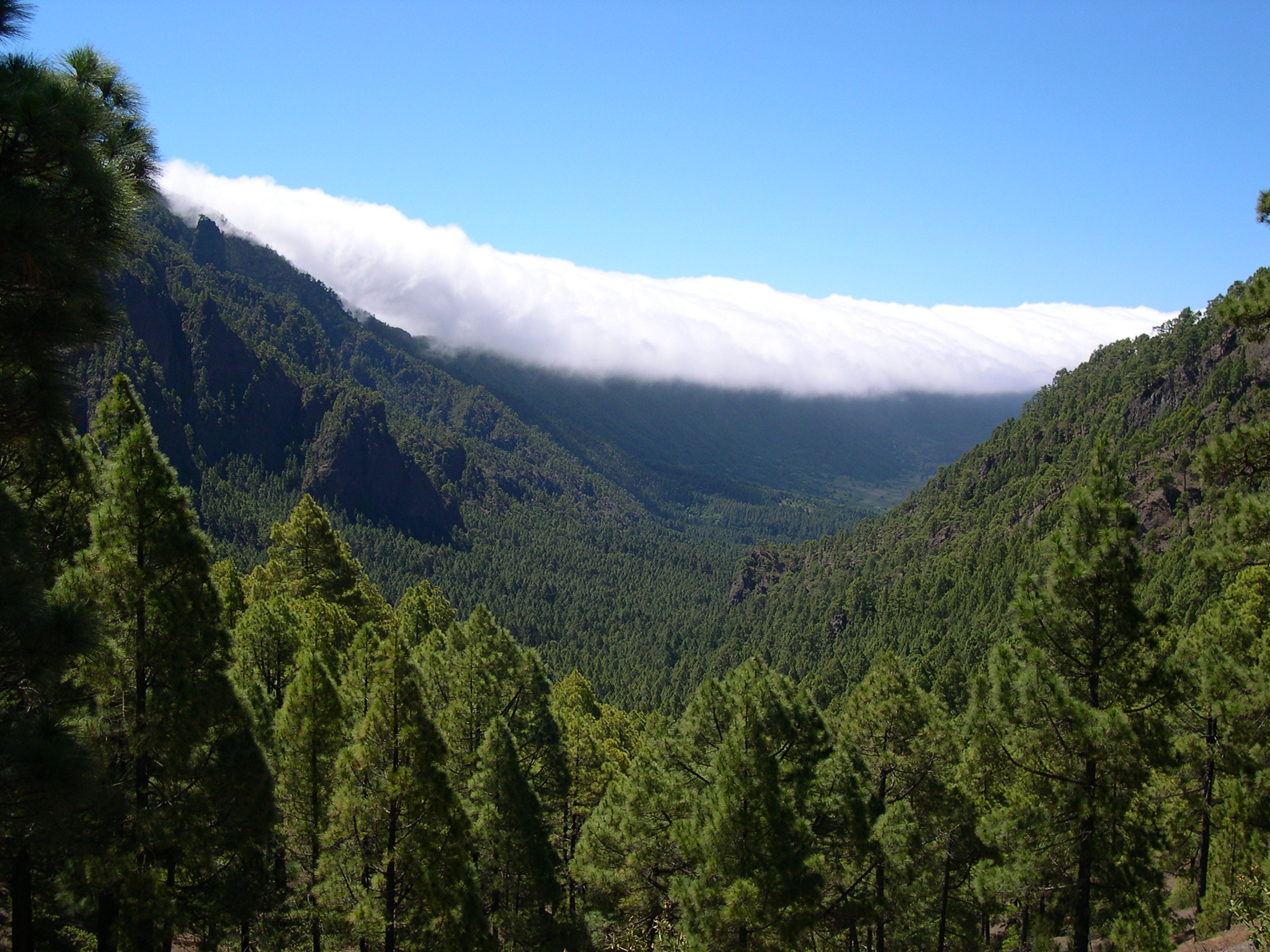
- Canary Island pines in Caldera de Taburiente, La Palma

Conservation status
- Least Concern (IUCN 3.1)

Scientific classification
- Kingdom: Plantae
- Clade: Tracheophytes
- Clade: Gymnosperms
- Division: Pinophyta
- Class: Pinopsida
- Order: Pinales
- Family: Pinaceae
- Genus: Pinus
- Subgenus: P. subg. Pinus
- Section: P. sect. Pinus
- Subsection: Pinus subsect. Pinaster
- Species: P. canariensis

Binomial name
- Pinus canariensis C.Sm. ex D.C.

= Pinus canariensis =

Pinus canariensis Canary Island pine

Species of tree

Pinus canariensis, the Canary Island pine or Canary pine, is a species of conifer in the family Pinaceae. A pine, it is a large tree, endemic to the outer Canary Islands of the Atlantic Ocean.

== Description ==
Pinus canariensis is a large coniferous tree, growing to 30–40 metres (98–131 feet) tall and 100–120 centimetres (39–47 inches) diameter at breast height, exceptionally up to 56 m (184 ft) tall and 988 cm (389 in) girth (314 cm (124 in) diameter). The green to yellow-green leaves are needle-like, in bundles of three, 20–30 cm (8–12 in) long, with finely toothed margins and often drooping. A characteristic of the species is the occurrence of epicormic shoots with single (not in threes) glaucous (bluish-green) juvenile leaves growing from the lower trunk, but in its natural area this only occurs as a consequence of fire or other damage. The cones are 10–18 cm (4–7 in) long, 5 cm (2 in) wide, glossy chestnut-brown in colour and frequently remaining closed for several years (serotinous cones). Its closest relatives are the chir pine (P. roxburghii) from the Himalayas, the Mediterranean pines P. pinea, P. halepensis, P. pinaster and P. brutia from the eastern Mediterranean.

== Taxonomy ==
Pinus canariensis was first described in 1825 by Augustin Pyramus de Candolle, who attributed the name to Christen Smith. It has been placed in subsection Pinaster of subgenus Pinus, section Pinus. The other species in the subsection are mainly Mediterranean in distribution, with one species (P. roxburghii) from the Himalayas.

== Distribution and habitat ==
The species is native and endemic to the outer Canary Islands (Gran Canaria, Tenerife, El Hierro and La Palma). It is a subtropical pine and does not tolerate low temperatures or hard frost, surviving temperatures down to about −6 to −10 °C (21 to 14 °F). Within its natural area, it grows under extremely variable rainfall regimes, from less than 300 millimetres (12 in) to several thousands, mostly due to differences in mist-capturing by the foliage. Under warm conditions, this is one of the most drought-tolerant pines, living even with less than 200 mm (8 in) of rainfall per year.

The native range has been somewhat reduced due to over-cutting so that only the islands of Tenerife, La Palma, and Gran Canaria still have large forests, with extensive replanting of deforested areas since 1940. Really big trees are rare due to past over-cutting. It is the tallest tree in the Canary Islands, with the tallest specimen, 'Pino de las Dos Pernadas' near Vilaflor on Tenerife, being 56.7 m (186 ft) tall.

== Fossil record ==
Fossils of Pinus canariensis have been described from the fossil flora of Kızılcahamam district in Turkey which is of early Pliocene age. Fossil cones including seeds of Pinus canariensis are known from the late Miocene of Abkhazia, from the Vienna Basin and the Canary Islands. Numerous cone casts including seeds of Pinus canariensis from the early Pleistocene, were recovered on Kallithea, Rhodes.

== Ecology ==
This pine is one of the most fire-resistant conifers in the world, due to several beneficial adaptations. In particular, Pinus canariensis is one of the few pine species that can epicormically resprout after losing its needles in a fire.

== Uses ==
The tree's long needles make a significant contribution to the islands' water supply, trapping large amounts of cloud droplets as fog drip. This comes from the moist air coming off the Atlantic with the prevailing north eastern wind (locally called "alisios" or "tiempo norte"); the fog drip measured under trees can be up to 20 times the rainfall measured in the open away from trees at the same site. The condensation after dropping to the ground is quickly absorbed by the soil, and percolates down to the underground aquifers.

The aromatic wood, especially the heartwood, is among the finest of pine woods, being hard, strong and durable. The wood of the Canary island pine is now becoming popular as a tonewood for soundboards for guitars and other string instruments. The aromatic heartwood (locally called "tea") is also traditionally used in La Palma for making wine aging containers called pipas.

Pinus canariensis is a popular ornamental tree in warmer climates, such as in private gardens, public landscapes, and as street trees. In mainland Spain, South Africa, Sicily, Australia, and California, it has become a naturalised species from original landscape uses.

== In culture ==
It is the vegetable symbol of the island of La Palma.

== Gallery ==
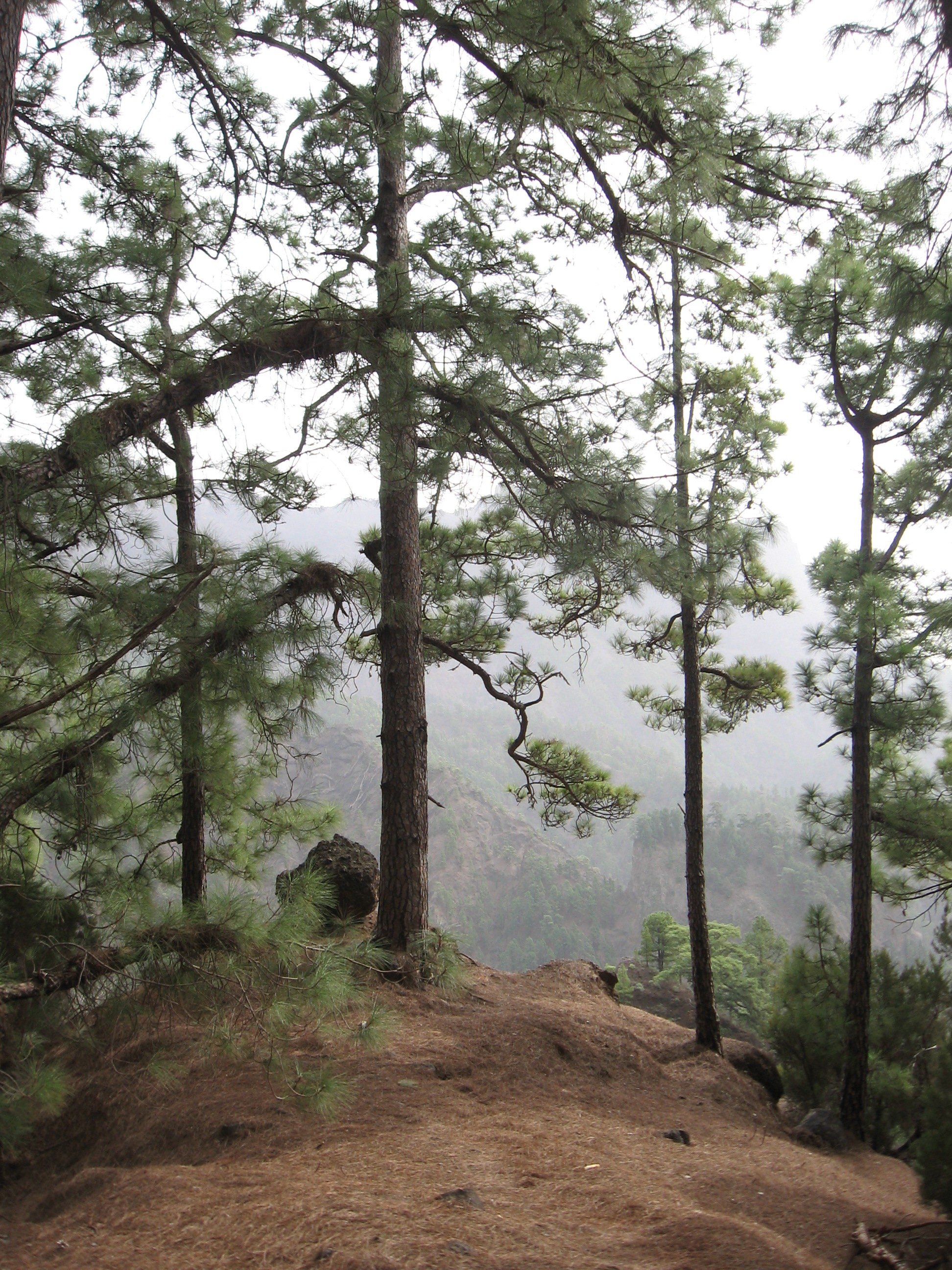
In natural habitat on Canary Islands

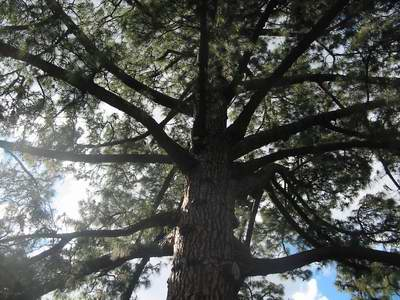
Trunk

Epicormic shoots

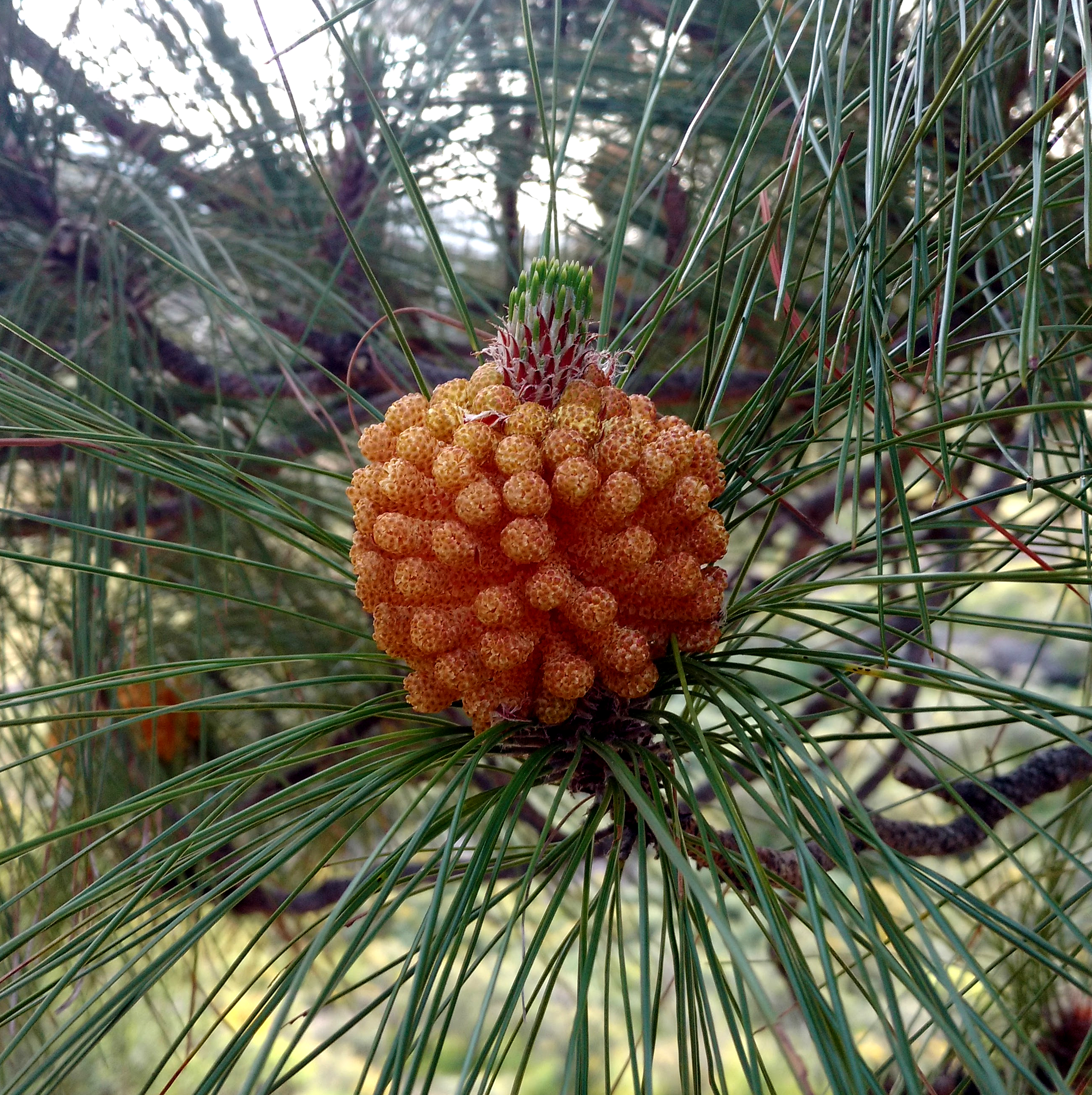
A cluster of mature male cones of a Pinus canariensis in Gran Canaria

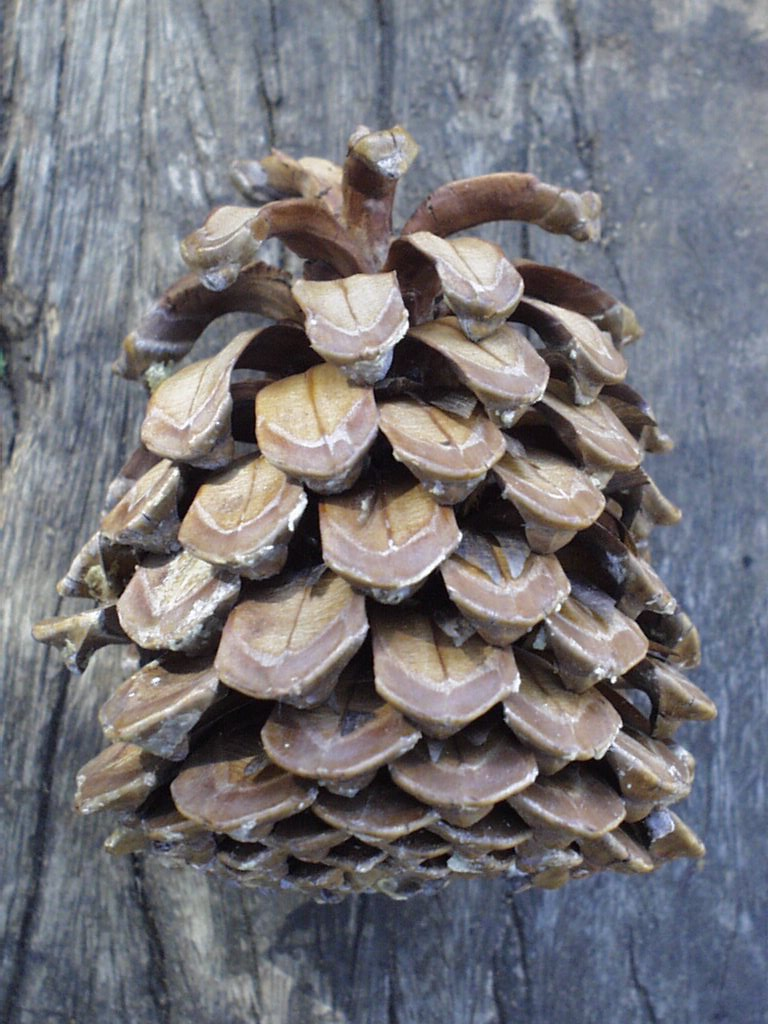
Mature opened female cone

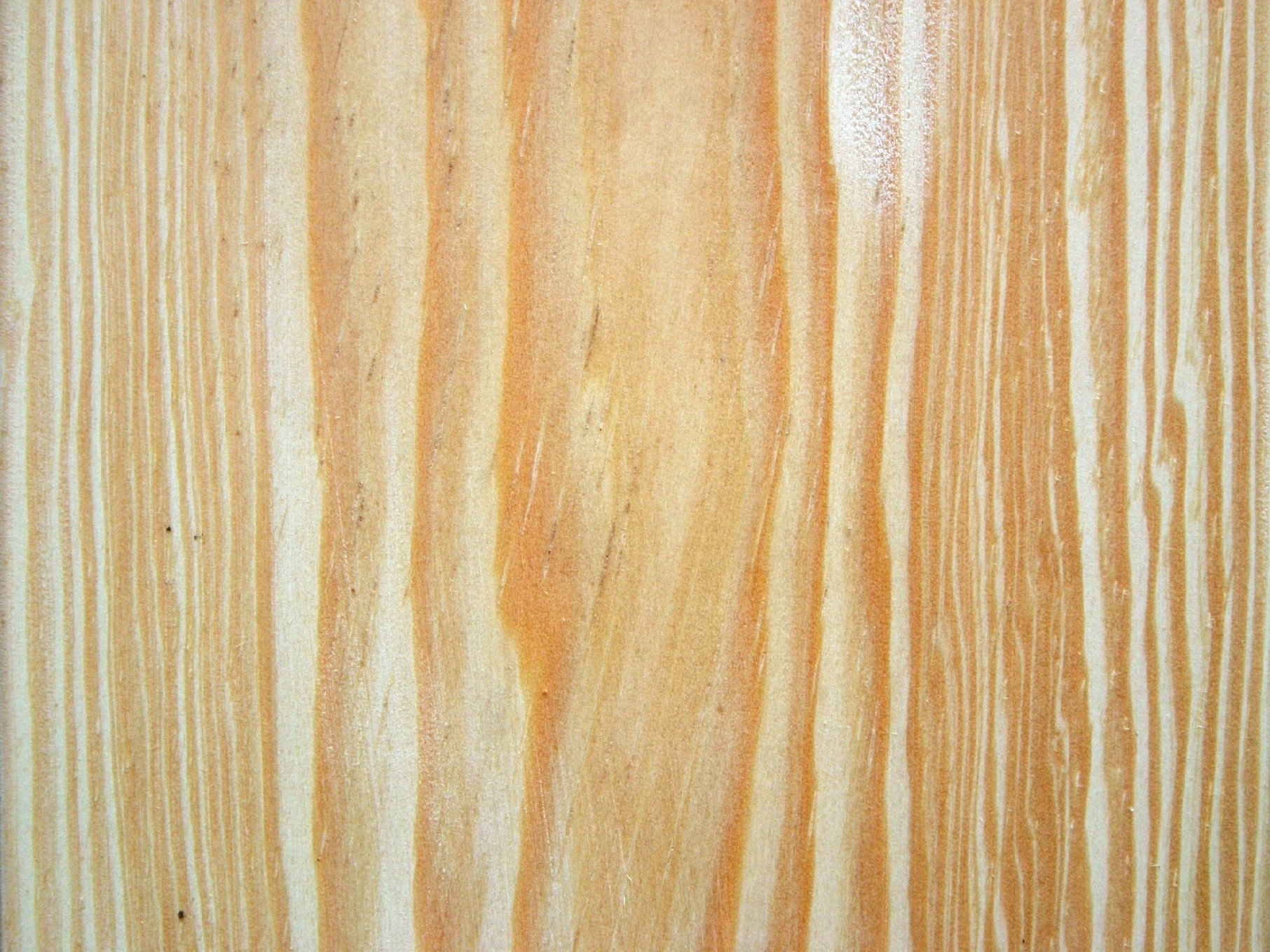
Figure on timber

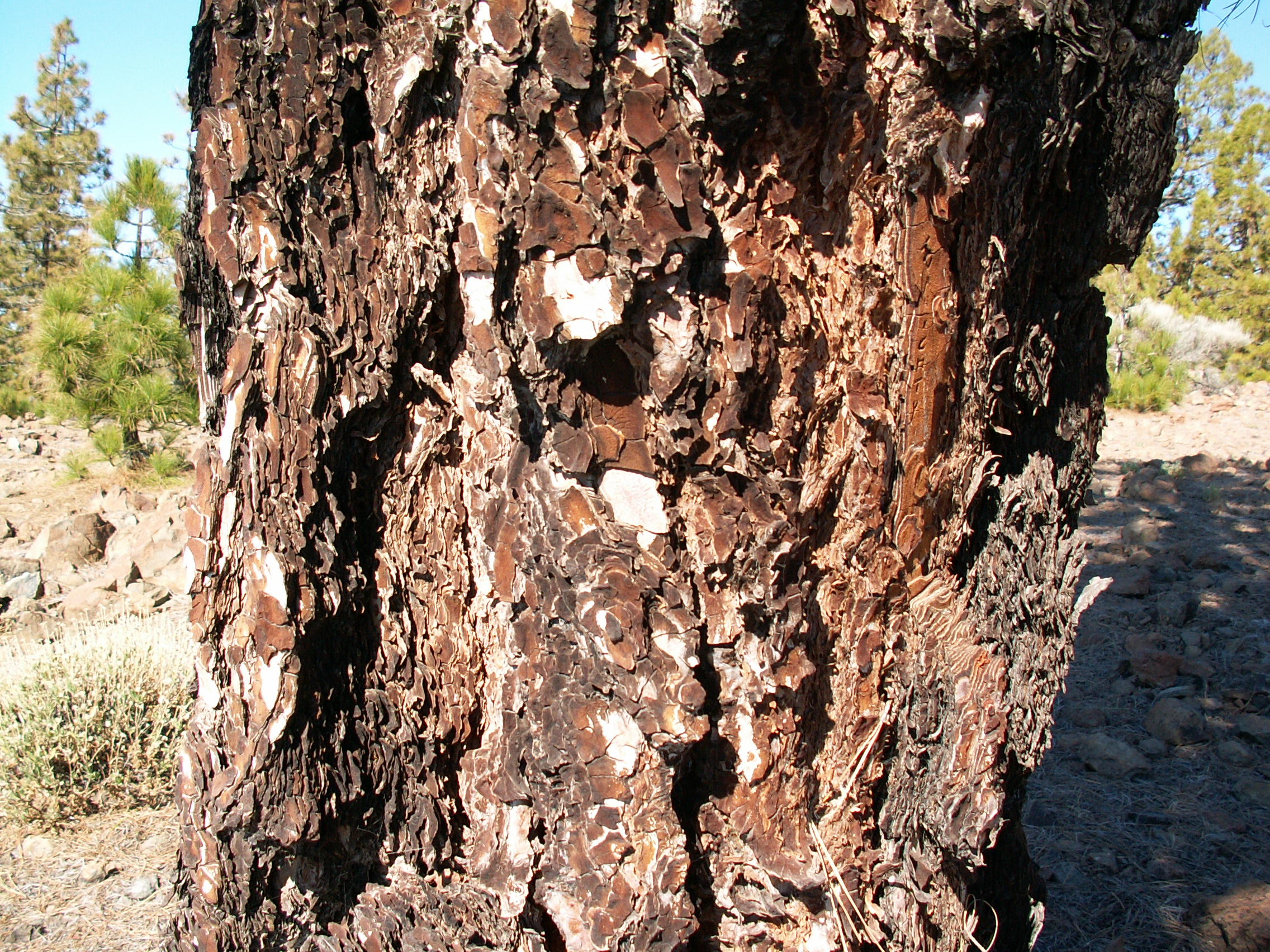
Fire-resistant trunk

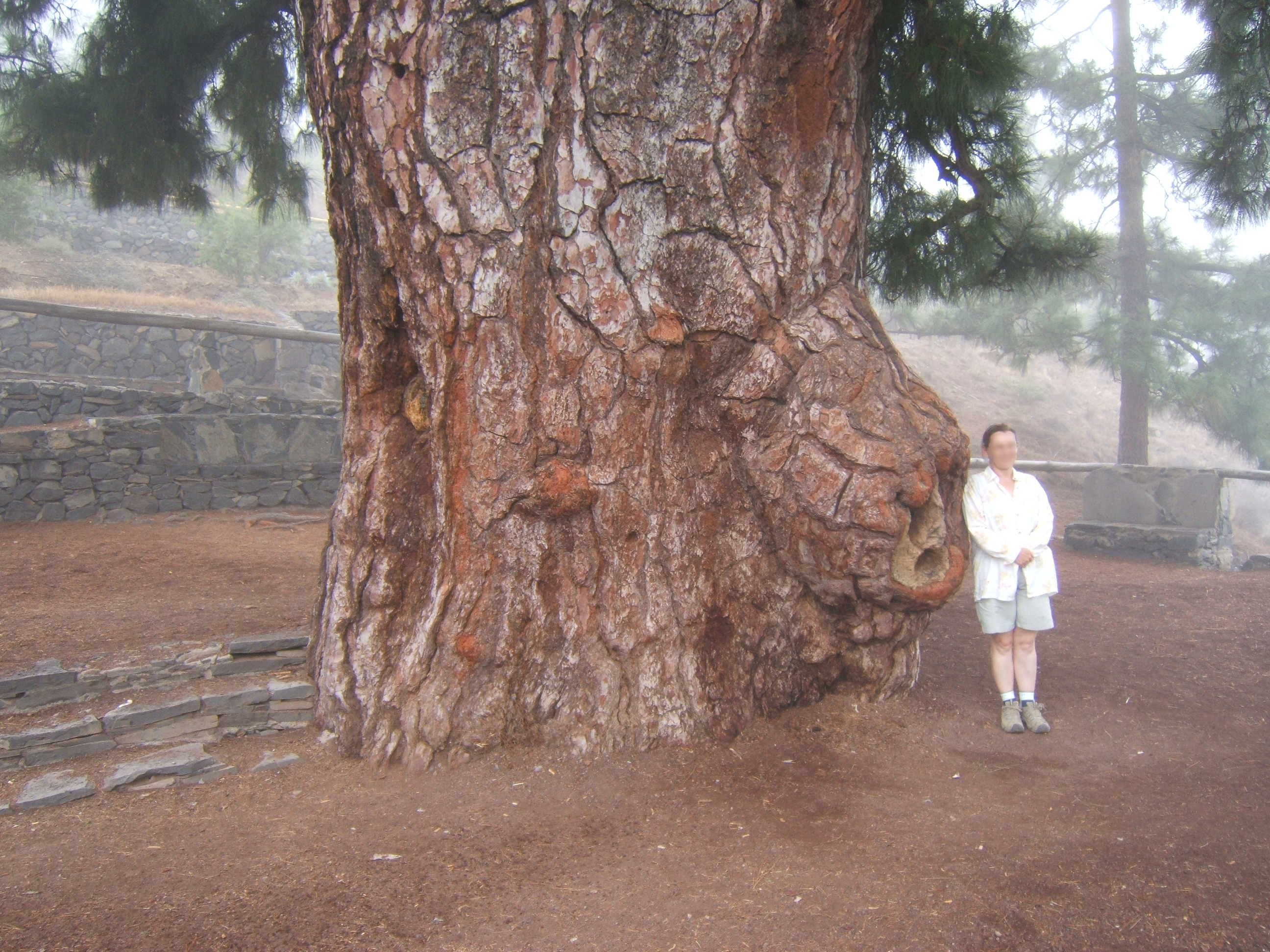
Vilaflor, Tenerife

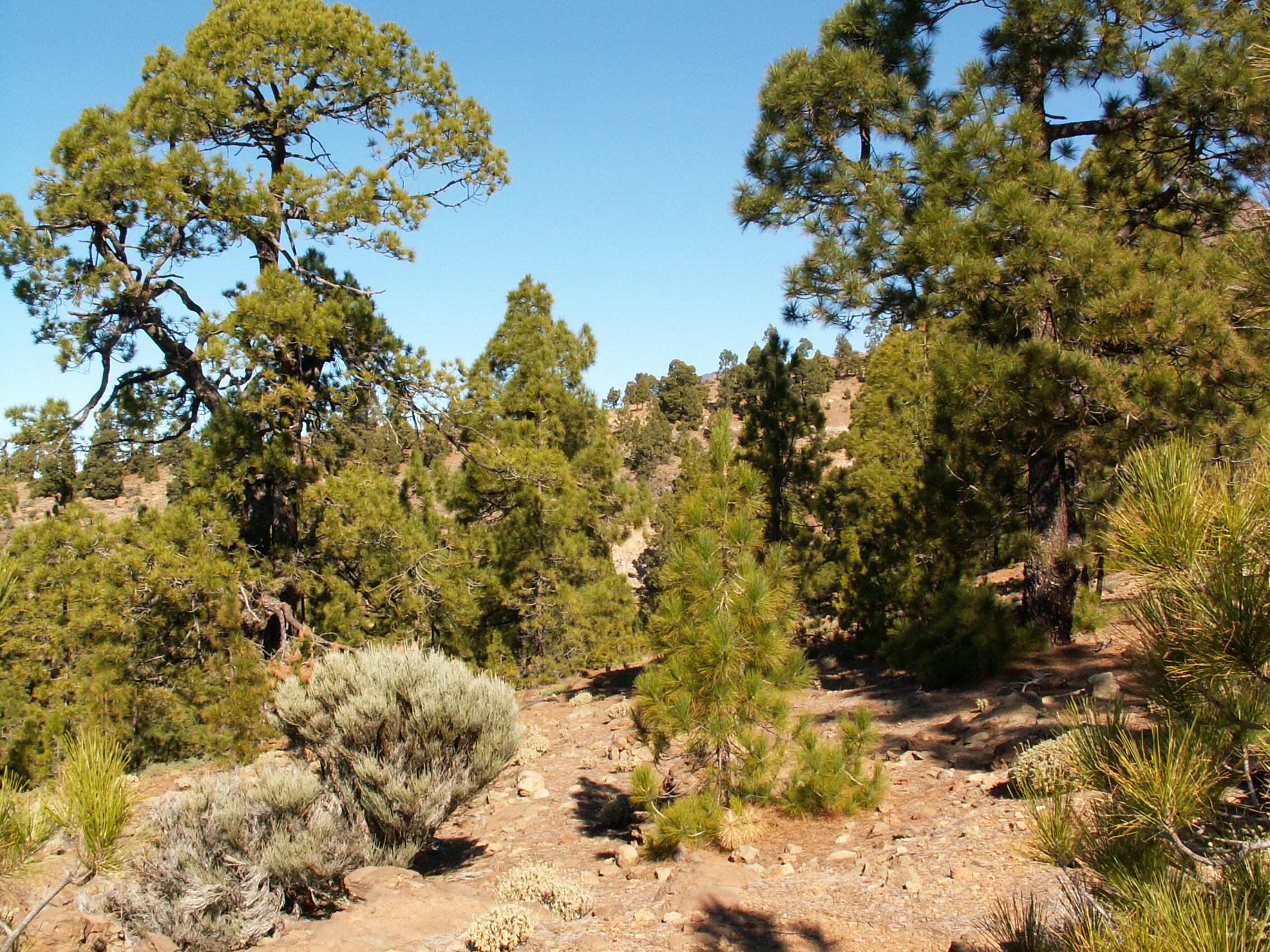
Tenerife south

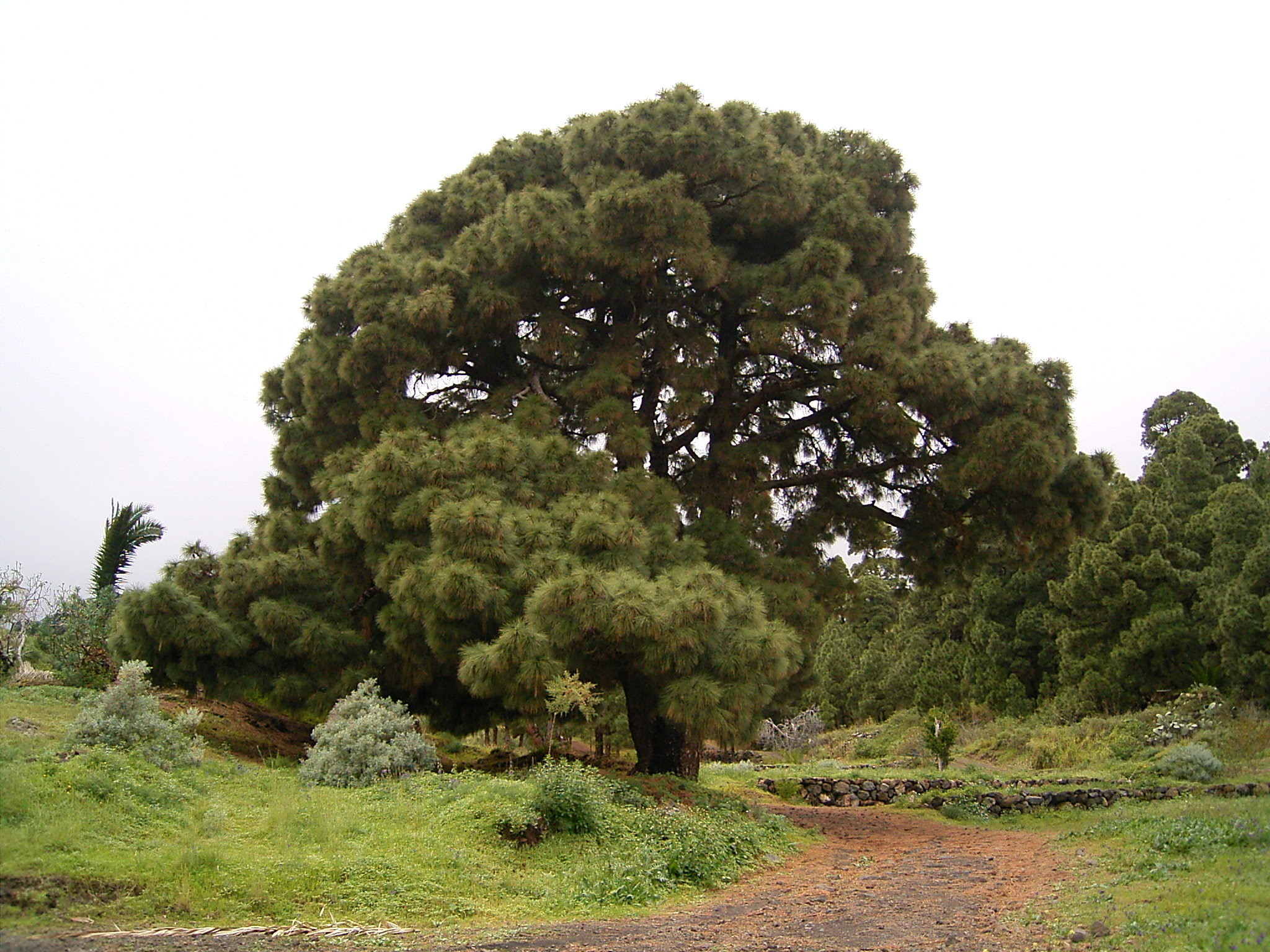
Pinus canariensis, Santa Cruz

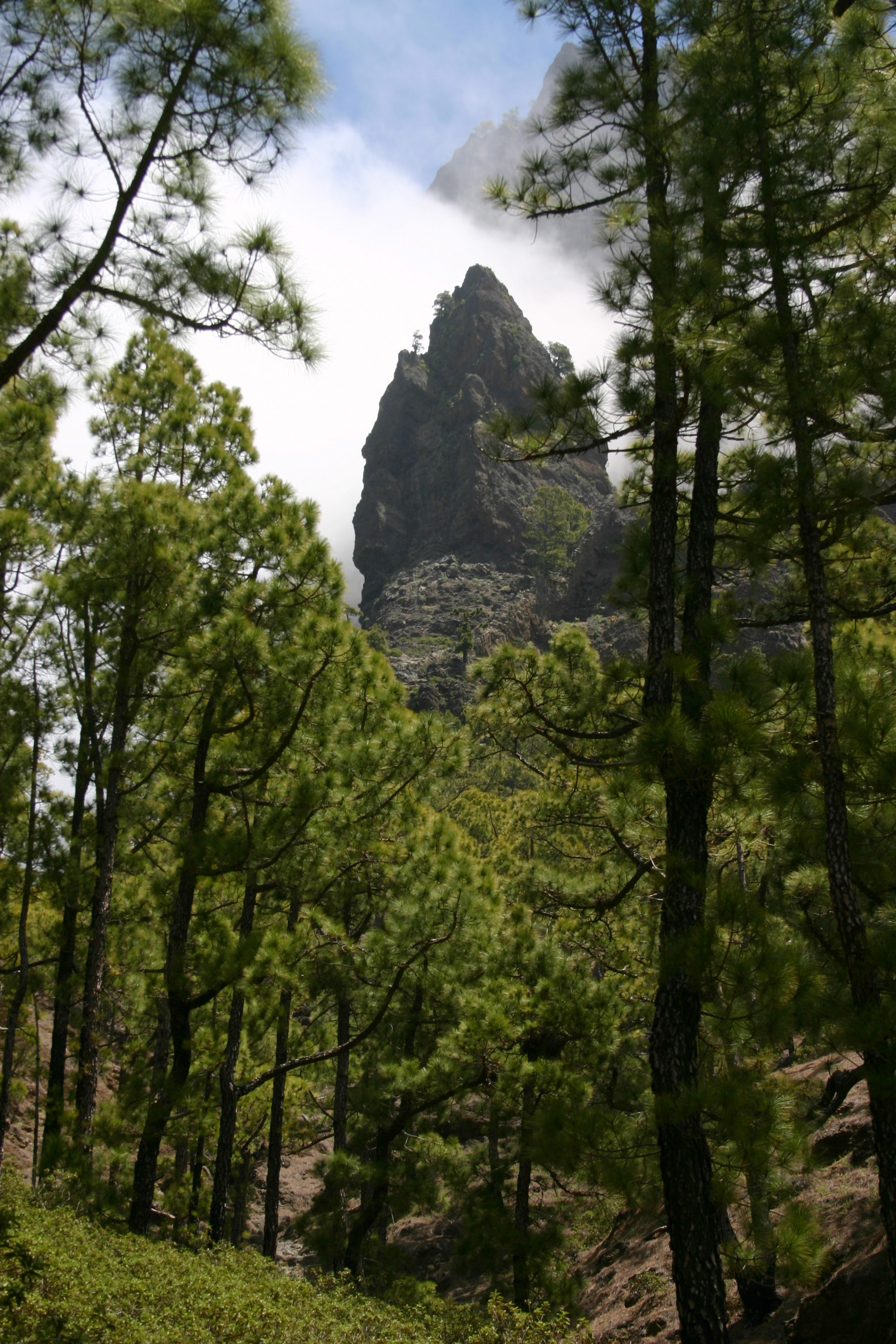
Pinus canariensis forest, La Palma

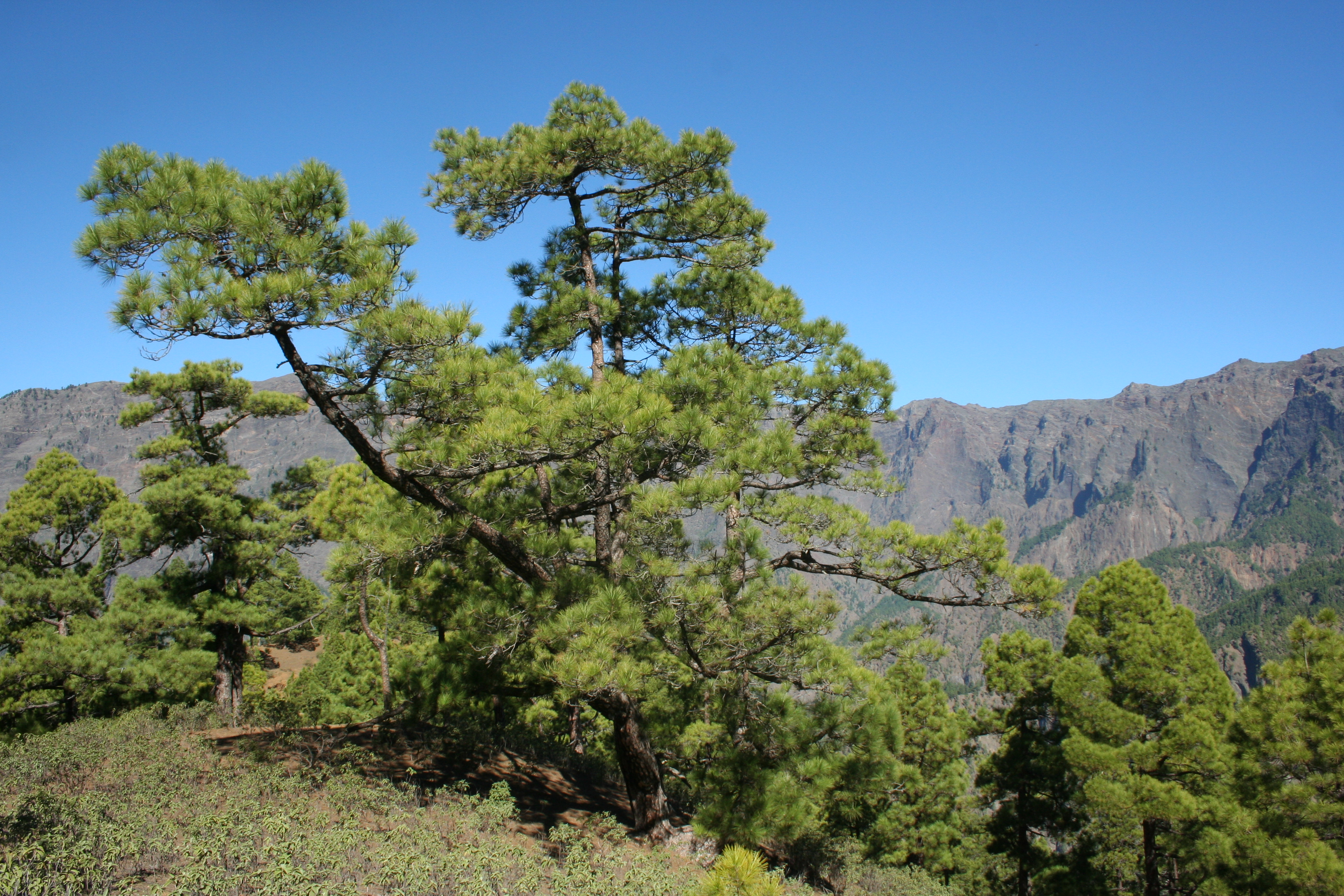
Pinus canariensis Caldera de Taburiente

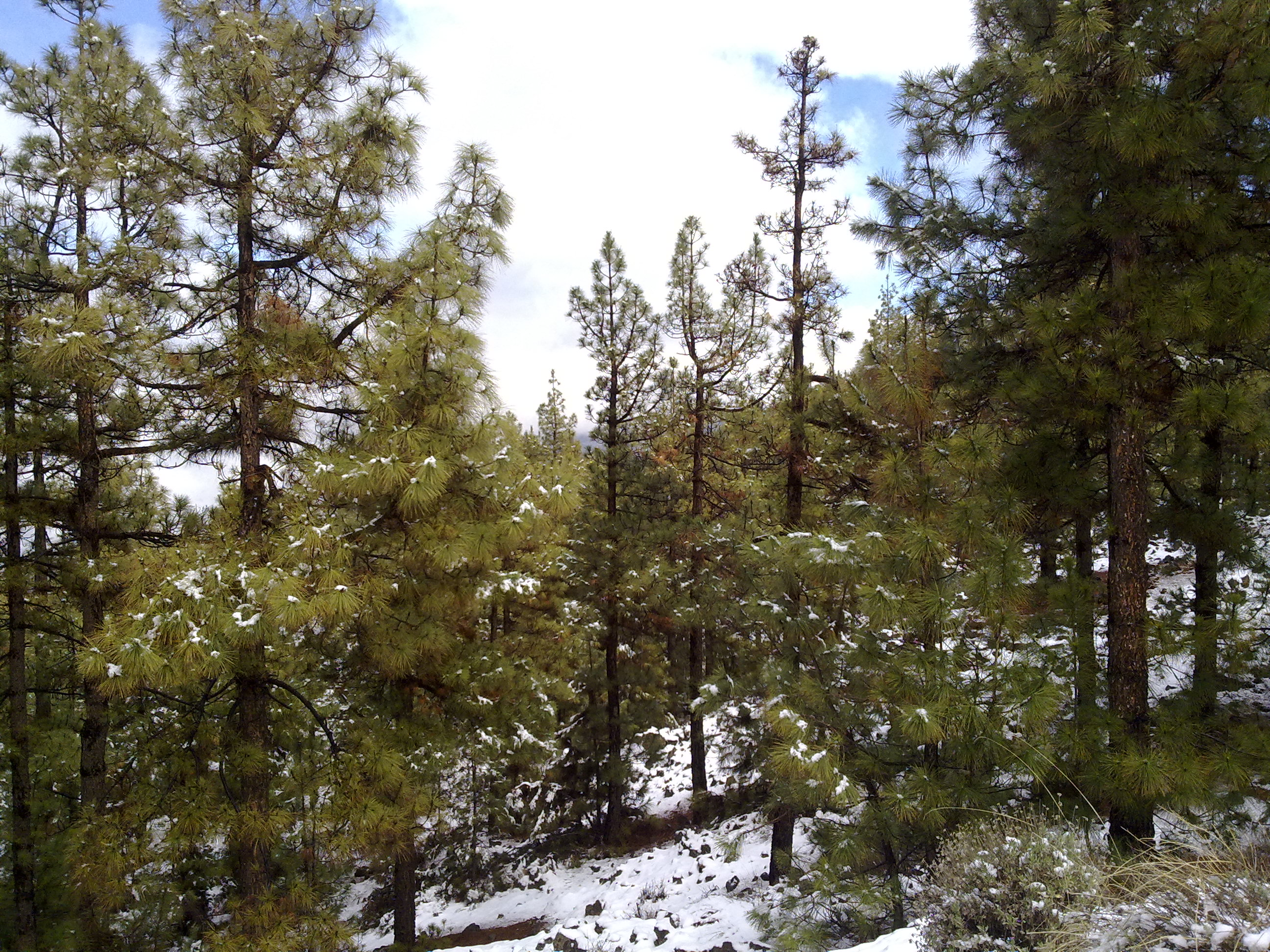
Tenerife

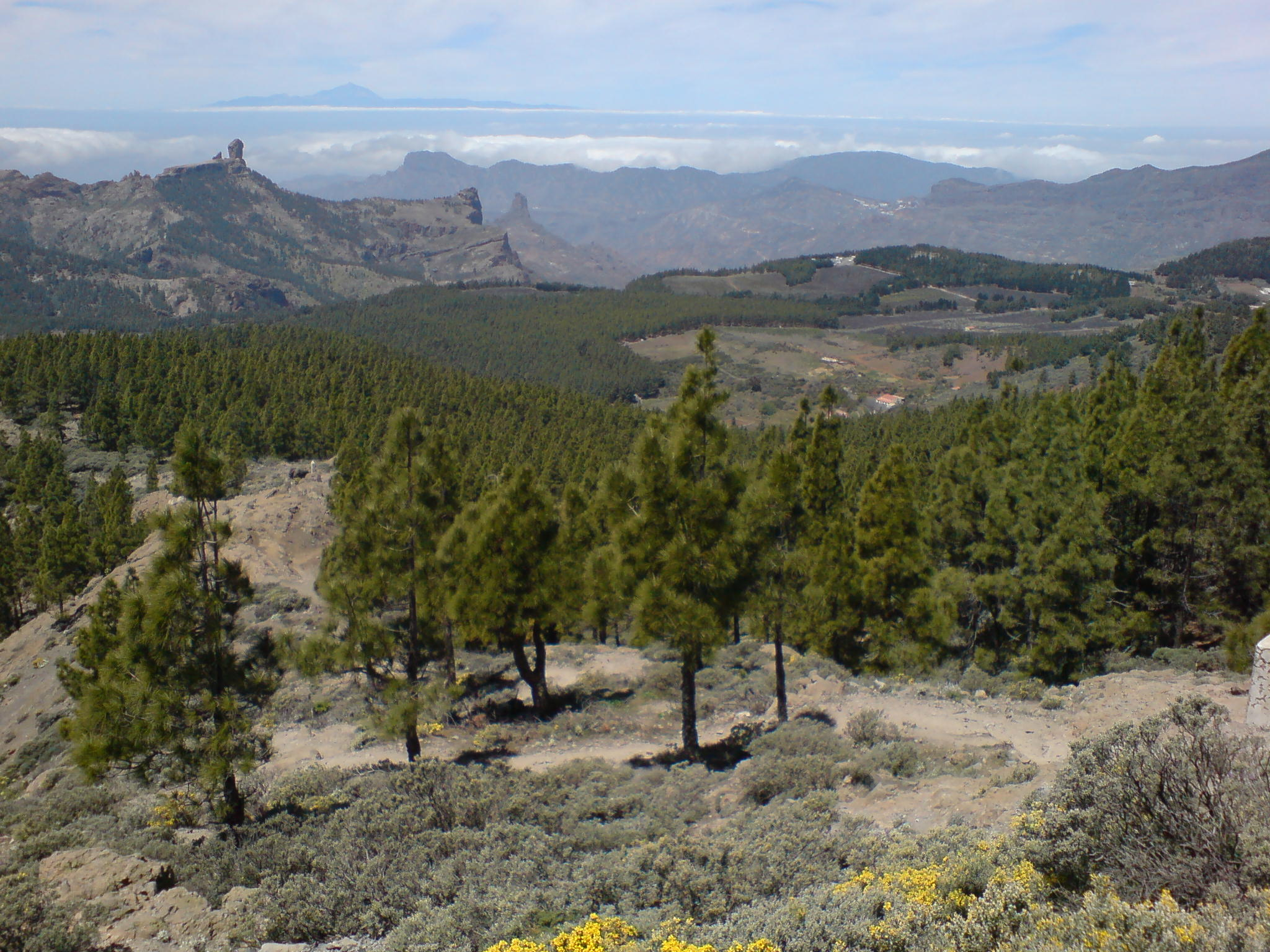
Gran Canaria

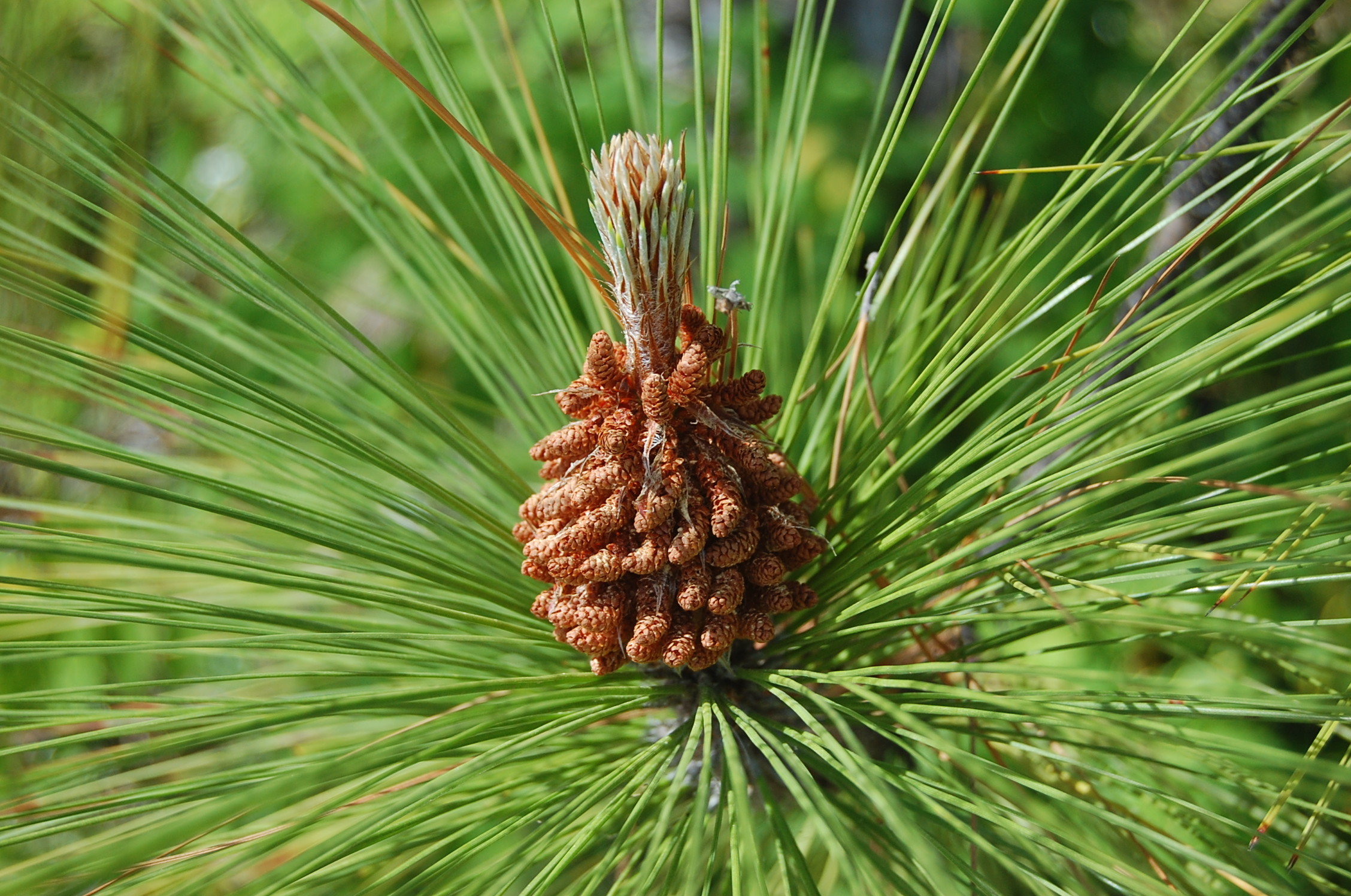
Male cones of Pinus canariensis photographed in Temecula, California, US

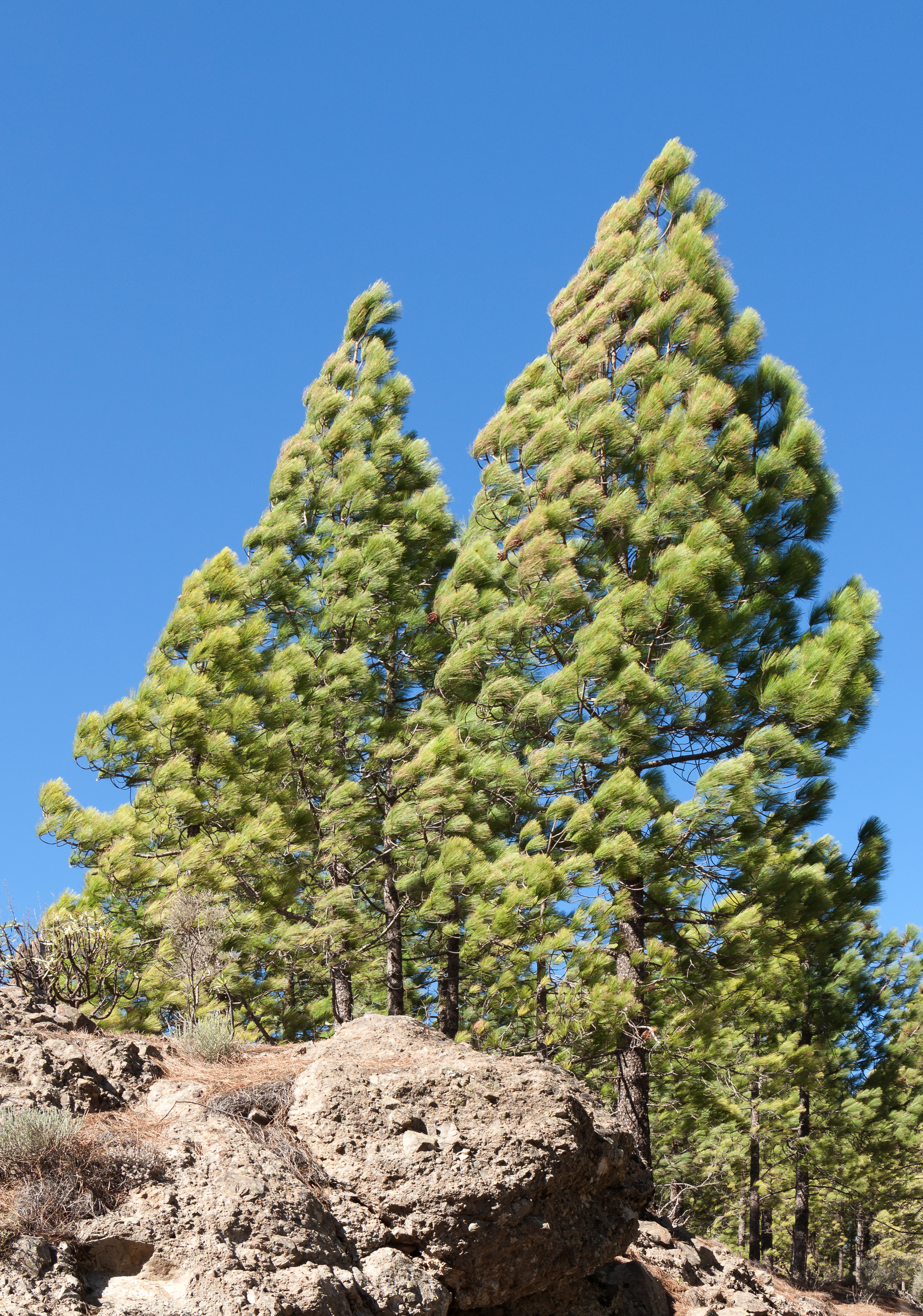
Ayacata, San Bartolomé de Tirajana, Gran Canaria, Canary Islands, Spain

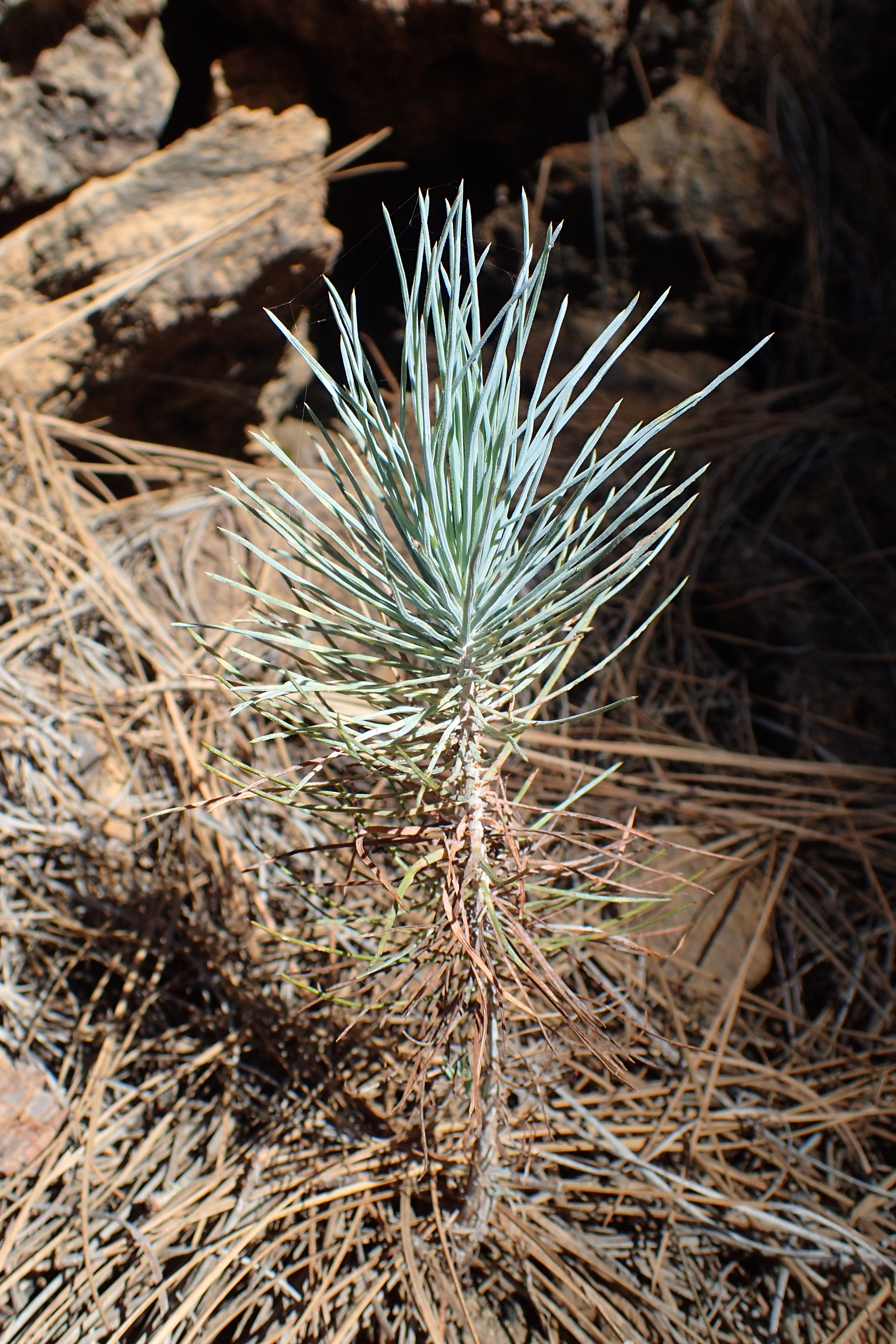
Seedling in La Talleta, Tenerife, Canary Islands

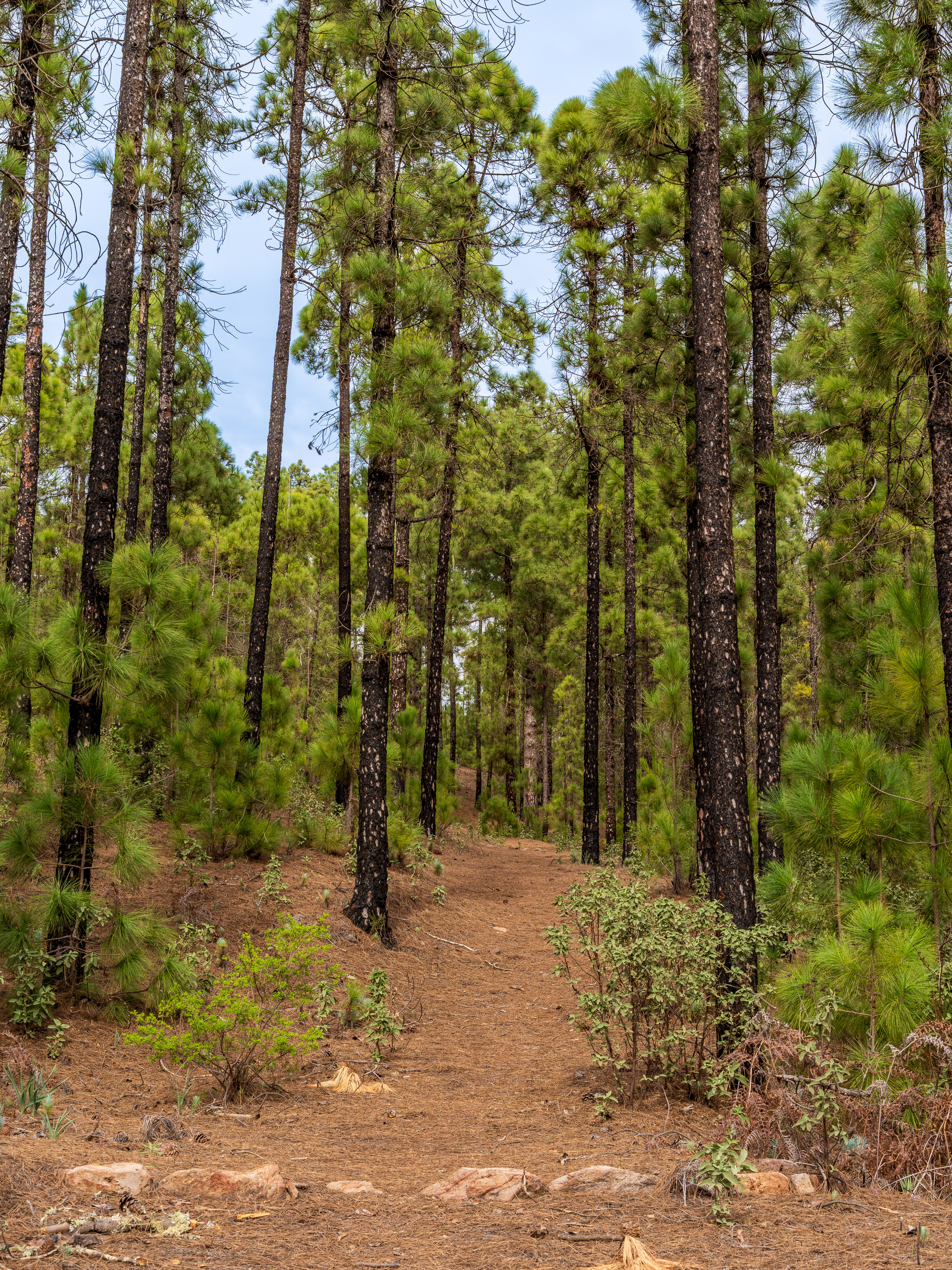
Pinus canariensis forest in Tamadaba Natural Park

== See also ==
- List of animal and plant symbols of the Canary Islands
