= Spherosome =

Class of cell organelles

Spherosomes, also called lipid droplets or oleosomes are small cell organelles bounded by a single membrane which take part in storage and synthesis of lipids.

== General structure and function ==
=== Structure ===
Spherosomes were first observed by Hanstein (1880) but discovered by Perner (1953). Term spherosomes was given by Dangeard. Sphaerosomes are small spherical and refractile vesicles which are 0.5-1.0 μm in diameter. They arise from endoplasmic reticulum and are surrounded by a single but half-unit membrane with phospholipid monolayer having polar heads towards the cytosol and hydrophobic tails towards the inner side.

Usually, phospholipids orient themselves in a bilayer manner, as seen in almost the entirety of the cellular endomembrane system. This results from the very amphipathic nature of the phospholipid itself, as the phosphate head is hydrophilic, while the fatty acid tail is hydrophobic. The general cellular environment and cytosol is considered aqueous, so it causes the phosphate heads to orient towards and interact with the aqueous environment, while the hydrophobic tails orient themselves away from interacting with the aqueous environment. In the case of the spherosome, the membrane is only composed of one layer of phospholipids, meaning the membrane is entirely hydrophobic (lipophilic) due to the high concentration fatty acid tails. For most organelles, having the entire inside functional space be entirely lipophilic would lead to drastic dysfunction but in the context of the spherosome, it makes perfect sense as one of the primary function of the spherosome is to make and store lipids for the cell's use. A study from the University of South Carolina found that the specific phospholipid content of the spherosome single membrane within a castor bean endospore was phosphatidylcholine, phosphatidylethanolamine, and phosphatidylinositol. All of these phospholipids were found in roughly equal amounts following a sucrose density gradient centrifugation.

In addition, it was found that spherosomes may also differ in density, and the difference in density can be attributed to differences in the fatty acid and phospholipid content. Spherosomes isolated from aleurone layers of wheat by density gradient centrifugation were found to either be light (less dense), or heavy (very dense,) with this density being similar to that of a mitochondria. The lighter spherosomes had more triglyceride content compared to the heavier, more dense spherosomes which had more phospholipid content.

Oleosomes are naturally occurring oil droplets in numerous types of seeds, and are extremely similar to spherosomes in their general structure and function. Olesomes comprise up to 20-50% of the seed mass and their function is to safely store energy in the form of triglycerides and use the energy during germination. While it may seem there is no difference between olesomes and spherosomes, olesomes have not been shown to exhibit lysosomal activity like the spherosome has.

Osmium tetroxide binds to lipids, consequently staining and fixing them, making the lipids then visible during electron scanning. In the staining of plasma membrane like structures, such as spherosomes, osmium tetroxide binds to the phospholipid regions, thus creating a contrast with the surrounding cytoplasm making it easy to identify the lipid monolayer. Specifically, osmium tetroxide is reduced when interacting with double bonds of lipids, leading to a reduction reaction and metallic osmium being formed. This metal reflects the electron beams during electron microscopy, leading to the dark staining structures.

=== Function ===
Spherosomes of some tissues (like tobacco endosperm, maize root tip, etc.) contain hydrolytic enzymes. Therefore, they are also considered to have lysosomal activity.

== Lysosomal characteristics ==
It has been found that the spherosomes in some plant cells function very similarly to lysosomes. Lysosomes are also single membrane organelles and can bind and bud off from the wider endomembrane system, just like spherosomes. In both plant and animal cells, lysosomes function very similarly, in that they contain numerous different types of hydrolytic enzymes that can break down basically anything the cells need destroyed or recycled. A study from the Department of General Botany, Swiss Federal Institute of Technology, found that in higher plant cells, a variety of cellular acid hydrolases and other enzymes, specifically proteases, phosphatases, esterases and ribonucleases, were associated with spherosomes after density gradient centrifugation. The primary function of the broader group of acid hydrolases is to break down and metabolize proteins, carbohydrates, nucleotides, and phospholipids, recycling or degrading molecules whenever these molecules whenever the cell needs. As previously mentioned, other lipid containing organelles within plant cells do not exhibit this hydrolase activity so this function may be unique to spherosomes, but more research is needed before definitive conclusions can be made.

One way in which the spherosomes' enzymatic and lysosomal characteristics have been shown is in the formation of cytomictic channels. These channels, which directly connect the cytoplasm of two adjacent cells, are absolutely essential for plant growth and development. These channels can become so large and interconnected that even the nucleus of one cell can mirage to another cell. Specifically within tobacco microsporocytes, or diploid cells that undergo meiosis to produce two distinct daughter cells, it has been found that spherosomes are crucial in the development of cytomictic channels. Plant cells possess a hard cell wall made of cellulose, so the enzyme callase is necessary for the degradation of cellulose and the consequent cytomictic channel formation between microsporocytes. An active form of callase was found within spherosomes, but not within the endoplasmic reticulum or golgi apparatus, suggesting it is in fact the spherosomes function to degrade the cell wall. The degradation of the cell wall by the spherosomes can therefore lead to the formation of the cytomictic channels.

== Real-world applications ==
=== Removal of chloroform from tap water ===
One promising area of study on spherosomes comes from rice bran spherosomes. Rice bran is the hard, outer layer of rice, and it contains notably more fat than any other part of rice. A 2008 study found that the spherosomes within rice bran were able to effectively remove chloroform from water. The results of the study show that spherosomes removed chloroform from tap water with 90% efficiency after 90 minutes, significantly higher than traditional chloroform removers such as activated carbon. Chloroform is found in all chlorinated tap water, and while low consumption levels of chloroform are considered harmless, high levels of chloroform have been shown to cause cancer damage to the liver and kidneys. Tap water is also a major source of environmental exposure to chloroform, so the benefits of removing chloroform are very widespread. There is much potential for spherosomes from rice bran as a potential remover of chloroform; rice bran is a typical waste product from industrial rice equipment, and it is significantly cheaper to produce isolated spherosomes from rice bran than activated carbon.

=== Removal of tetrachlorethylene from soil ===
Another study from the Journal of Agriculture and Food Chemistry found that spherosomes from rice bran promote faster degradation of tetrachloroethylene in soil compared to the natural biological degradation of tetrachloroethylene in soil. The study found that the average time to complete degradation of tetrachloroethylene with spherosomes present is 25 days, while natural soil takes 38 days to degrade tetrachloroethylene. This colorless, odorless compound comes from many consumer products, such as skin products, wood cleaners, and some paint removers. The EPA considers tetrachloroethylene to be carcinogenic to humans by all routes of exposure so keeping levels low in soil, and thus levels low in drinking water is a priority for many in bioremediation.

== Future research and applications ==
In recent years, spherosomes, olesomes, and oil droplets have all been grouped under the general term "lipid droplet", or LD for short. Publications on the subject have grown drastically over the last five years, but there are still numerous outstanding research questions regarding spherosomes and lipid droplets. Questions such as the relationship between lipid droplets (spherosomes) and peroxisomes within seedlings, how the membrane associated proteins of the LDs affect the abiotic and biotic stress response in plants, and potential genetic engineering or modification of LD associated enzymes to improve oil production and quality, have all been at the forefront for researchers in recent years.
