= Martin Richard Flor =

Danish-born Norwegian botanist, schoolmaster and land economist (1772–1820)

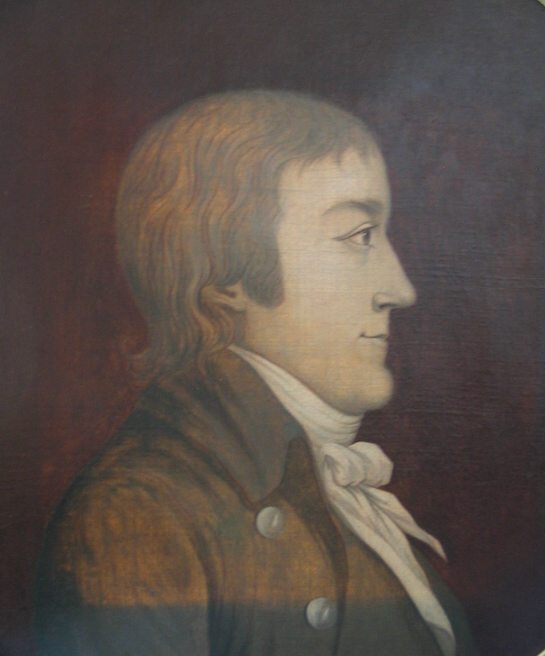

Martin Richard Flor (1772 – 24 February 1820) was a Danish‑born Norwegian botanist, schoolmaster and land economist whose works laid the foundations for botanical study in Norway. From 1800 he taught natural history at the Oslo Cathedral School and, from 1817, lectured in botany at the University of Christiania (now the University of Oslo). In that same year he published two complementary floras—the systematic Ledetraad and the school flora Systematisk Characteristik—followed in 1819 by Lægedomsplanter, the first Norwegian textbook on medicinal plants for students.

== Early life and education ==
Martin Richard Flor was born in 1772 on the island of Tåsinge in Denmark. In 1790 he completed his studies at Odense Latin School and proceeded to the University of Copenhagen, where he passed the examen philosophicum. He furthered his training at the private Naturhistorieselskabet in Copenhagen, attending the lectures of the distinguished botanist Martin Vahl, whose teaching shaped Flor's lifelong botanical interests. Many contemporaries—such as Christen Smith and Jens Hornemann—also studied at the same institute, marking it as a centre for Scandinavian naturalists.

== Career and works ==
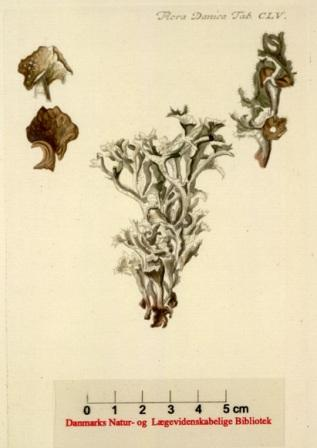
Engraving from the botanical work Flora Danica

Soon after graduation, Flor was selected for a newly created post in natural history at Christiania Cathedral School (now the Oslo Cathedral School), becoming Norway’s first dedicated natural‑science teacher. He later taught at the Military Academy, helped establish the Christiania Burgher School and conducted popular Sunday school classes. A staunch advocate of hands‑on learning, he led numerous botanical excursions—often held on Sundays—much to the displeasure of some colleagues and ecclesiastical authorities. In 1806 Flor took charge of the Paléhagen garden at Bjørvika, bequeathed to the school by chamberlain Bernt Anker, and maintained it as Norway's first public botanical garden (and the country’s first school garden) until the state assumed control in 1815. Throughout this period he collaborated with friends such as Christen Smith and Jens Wilken Hornemann, sowing some 258 species in 1813 alone. In April 1813 he received from forest‑inspector Nicolai Hersleb Ramm a detailed account of Norway’s first known lithopedion (a ten‑year 'stone baby') from Kvikne, which Flor preserved in his papers.

In 1817 Flor issued two floras: Systematisk Characteristik, a detailed local flora for pupils of the Cathedral School, and Ledetraad for Begyndere, a more widely aimed determination flora that incorporated Linnaean taxonomy as an integral framework. The following year he published Lægedomsplanter, which treated the medicinal plants of Class XXIV in Linnaeus's system and stands as Norway's first student text on medical botany. These works drew heavily on sources such as Frederik Christian Kielsen's Danish‑area flora, the later volumes of Flora Danica, Johan Wilhelm Palmstruch and Olof Swartz's Svensk botanik, and Christian Schkuhr's Riedgräsern.

== Death and legacy ==
Flor's health declined in the late 1810s amid what contemporary letters describe as a "weakening of mental faculties", and he died on 24 February 1820. His gravestone on Vår Frelsers gravlund in Oslo commemorates his roles as overlærer (senior teacher) and lektor (lecturer) in the botanical gardens at Tøyen. Although later critics dismissed him as an amateur, modern scholarship recognises Flor primarily as an innovative educator, populariser and land‑economist whose floristics work provided the basis upon which successors such as Matthias Numsen Blytt and Johan Kielland-Lund built Norway's botanical tradition. His portrait, alongside those of Carl Linnaeus and Martin Vahl, hangs in the Natural History Museum in Oslo.
