= HMS Congo =

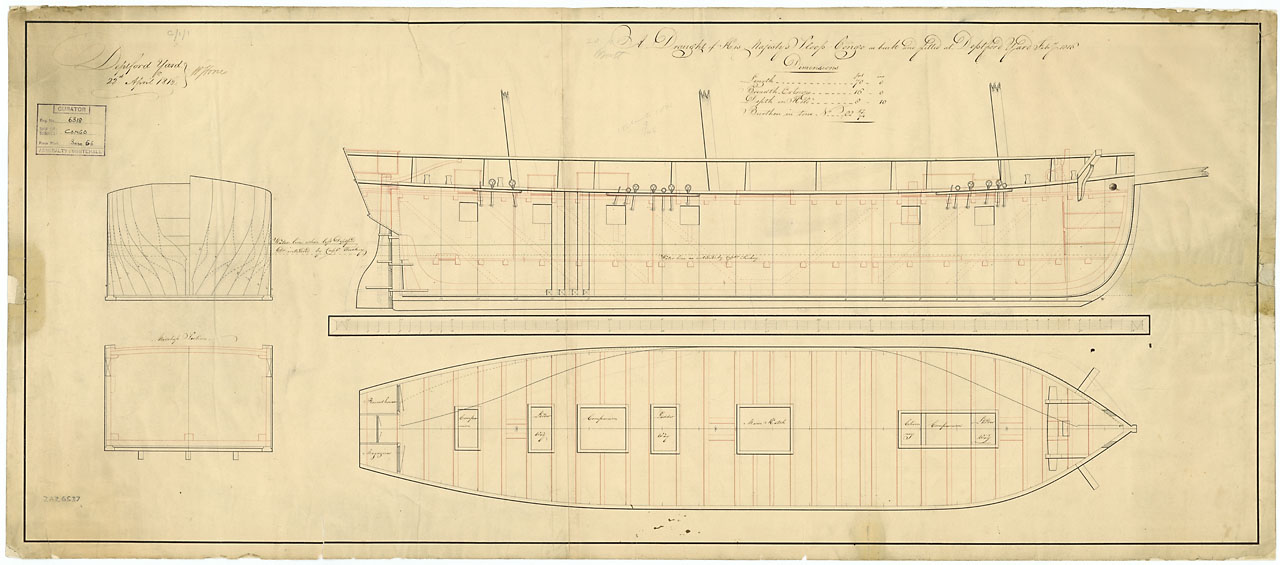
- Drawing of the Congo, 1816

History

United Kingdom
- Name: HMS Congo
- Ordered: 13 April 1815
- Builder: Deptford Dockyard; Engines by Boulton, Watt & Co.
- Laid down: October 1815
- Launched: 11 January 1816
- Completed: By 6 February 1816
- Reclassified: Survey ship in 1817; Hulked in 1819
- Fate: Sold on 15 March 1826

General characteristics
- Class & type: wooden paddle sloop; 3-masted schooner
- Tons burthen: 8257/94 (bm)
- Length: 70 ft (21.3 m) (overall); 60 ft 8 in (18.5 m) (keel)
- Beam: 16 ft (4.9 m)
- Draught: 4.25 ft (1.30 m)
- Depth of hold: 8 ft 10 in (2.69 m)
- Sail plan: 3-masted schooner
- Complement: 240
- Armament: 1 × 12-pounder carronade; 12 × 1/2-pdr swivel guns

HMS Congo was the first steam-powered warship built for the Royal Navy. She was classified as a steam sloop and was built in 1816 at Deptford Dockyard specifically for an exploration of the Congo River. Trials with her engine proved disappointing, and it was removed before she embarked on her first voyage.

== Design and construction ==
Congo was ordered on 13 April 1815 to a design by Sir Robert Seppings. She was laid down in October 1815 and launched on 11 January 1816. The steam engine is recorded as weighing 30 tons and was capable of developing 20 Horse Power.

Trials proved that this power, when transmitted to the paddle wheels, could only propel the vessel at about three knots. Such a rate of progress, coupled with unsatisfactory handling characteristics (she was described as very crank) resulted in the engine and paddle wheels being removed. Examination of the situation by James Watt Junior, son of James Watt, could only come up with a recommendation to use the engine for pumping out docks at Plymouth. Thus, Congo sailed to her destination without the steam engine, rigged as a schooner. A sectional profile, deck plan and body plan of Congo are reproduced from draughts held by the National Maritime Museum (Greenwich) in Marquardt's book The Global Schooner.

== The Congo expedition ==
The expedition, under James Hingston Tuckey, was the first attempt to map the Congo River, and did little beyond prove that the lower river was not navigable beyond one hundred miles (160 km) from the sea. The other thing it proved was that such expeditions were little more than suicide until medical science had improved - 38 of the 56 expedition members perished, including all of the officers and scientists and the crew that accompanied them inland. The cause of death was a "tropical fever", probably yellow fever. Most of the survivors were seamen who had stayed with the support vessel Dorothy at the rapids that blocked further progress. It was to be another fifty years before Henry Morton Stanley mapped the river. A full account of the fitting out of the ship and the circumstances of the disastrous expedition are chronicled in Leydon's Historical account of discoveries and travels in Africa (1817).

== Later career ==
Congo was fitted out as a hulk in 1819 and laid up in the Swale. She was sold at Rye to a J. Harvey on 15 March 1826 for the sum of £146.
