= James Hingston Tuckey =

- Born: August 1776; Greenhill, near Mallow, County Cork
- Died: 4 October 1816 (aged 40); Moanda, Kingdom of Kongo
- Military career
- Allegiance: Great Britain; United Kingdom
- Branch: Royal Navy
- Service years: 1793–1816
- Rank: Commander
- Commands: HMS Congo
- Conflicts: French Revolutionary Wars; Napoleonic Wars

James Hingston Tuckey (August 1776 – 4 October 1816) was an Irish-born British explorer and a captain in the Royal Navy. Some sources mistakenly refer to him as James Kingston Tuckey.

== Biography ==
Tuckey was born at Greenhill, near Mallow, August 1776. He went to sea at an early age, and in 1793 was received into the navy. From the first he saw a good deal of active service, and he was more than once wounded. He was engaged in expeditions to the Red Sea, and in 1802 he helped expand the British colony of New South Wales in Australia as first-lieutenant of the Calcutta were he was part of the first settlement party that landed on the Mornington Peninsula, in Victoria.

Amongst other services, he made a survey of Port Phillip District. On his return to England he published an Account of the Voyage to establish a Colony at Port Phillip. The Calcutta was captured by the French on a voyage from St. Helena in 1805, and Lieutenant Tuckey suffered an imprisonment of nearly nine years in France, during which time he married Miss Margaret Stuart, a fellow prisoner, and prepared a work on Maritime Geography and Statistics, published after his release.

Tuckey was described as tall, and had been handsome, but long and arduous service broke down his constitution, and by thirty he was grey-haired and nearly bald. Further it is described that his countenance was pleasing and pensive; he was gentle and kind in his manners, cheerful in conversation, and indulgent to those under his command.

== Death ==
In 1814 he was promoted to the rank of commander, and in February 1816 he sailed to explore the River Congo in the schooner Congo, accompanied by the stores ship Dorothy. The expedition aimed to find if there was a connection between the Congo and Niger basins of western and central Africa. Tuckey sailed up the river from its mouth but found that the lower river is not navigable due to rapids (later called the Yellala Falls) above Matadi. He only found ruins of the Portuguese colony and moribund Catholic missions. He suggested sending Protestant missionaries to the Congo. He explored the river up to Isangila. Most of the officers and crew died of fever and Tuckey himself died on 14 October 1816, aged 40, in Moanda, on the coast of today's DR Congo. The expedition was a failure but raised interest in the exploration of Africa.

== Named after ==
A species of flowering plants named Euphorbia tuckeyana is named for him, named by Philip Barker Webb in 1849; they are native to the Cape Verde Islands.

== Works ==
- An account of a voyage to establish a colony at Port Philip in Bass's Strait on the south coast of New South Wales, in His Majesty's Ship Calcutta, in the years 1802-3-4, London, Portsmouth: Longman, 1805, Wikidata Q19039311
- Tuckey, James Hingston (1815), Maritime geography and statistics, London: Black, Parry & Co
- Tuckey, James Hingston; Smith, Christen (1818), Narrative of an expedition to explore the river Zaire usually called the Congo, in South Africa, in 1816, under the direction of Captain J.K. Tuckey R.N. To which is added, The journal of Professor Smith; some general observations on the country and its inhabitants, London: J. Murray, OL 234844M
