= List of futurologists =

Futures studies influencers

"Futurology" as a term was coined in the twentieth century. What counts under that term has changed over time; as such, this list is a jumble, and is intended to be suggestive, not definitive. Notable futurologists include:

Name	Birth	Death	Field or notable accomplishment
Abishur Prakash	1991	living	geopolitical futurist, author
Adrian Berry	1937	2016	writer, journalist
Alan Marshall	1975	living	academic, environmentalist, social scientist, writer
Aldous Huxley	1894	1963	writer of Brave New World, psychedelic prophet
Alvin & Heidi Toffler	1928/1929	2016/2019	wrote Future Shock, and sequels, technological singularity
Anders Sandberg	1972	living	human enhancement
Anders Sörman-Nilsson	1981	living	digital transformation
Andrey Korotayev	1961	living	mathematical modeling of global future
Archibald Low	1888	1956	space
Arthur C. Clarke	1917	2008	writer
Ash Koosha	1985	living	Futurist Composer and Producer
Ashis Nandy	1937	living	writer on colonialism
Ben Goertzel	1966	living	artificial general intelligence researcher, OpenCog
Bertrand de Jouvenel	1903	1987	economist
Bill Joy	1954	living	UNIX, technology dangers
Jonathan Brill	1967	living	futurist, author, inventor
Bruce Sterling	1954	living	living design, information technology
Buckminster Fuller	1895	1983	architect, cosmologist, whole-systems thinker, designer/inventor
Carl Sagan	1934	1996	astronomer
Clement Bezold	1948	living	healthcare
Dandridge M. Cole	1921	1965	space colonization
Daniel Bell	1919	2011	"Post-Industrial Society"
Daniel Burrus	1947	living	futurist, business advisor, author
Darla Jane Gilroy		living	futurist, trendspotting
David Passig	1957	living	anticipatory anthropology
Deane Hutton	1941	living	communicator
Dennis Gabor	1900	1979	holography
Dirk HR Spennemann		living	space heritage
Donald Prell	1924	2020	venture capital, strategic foresight, technological singularity
Donella Meadows	1941	2001	systems thinking, leverage points, sustainability
Douglas Engelbart	1925	2013	hypertext, mouse, interactive computing
Douglas Rushkoff	1961	living	media theorist, writer, columnist, lecturer, graphic novelist, and documentarian, early cyberpunk culture, open source
Fabienne Goux-Baudiment	1960	living	strategic foresight
Edward Bellamy	1850	1898	wrote Looking Backward: 2000–1887 , a utopia about the future year 2000, economic reorganization
Eliezer Yudkowsky	1979	living	friendly artificial intelligence
Erich Jantsch	1929	1980	book The Self-Organizing Universe: Scientific and Human Implications of the Emerging Paradigm of Evolution
Faith Popcorn	1948	living	popcorn report
FM-2030	1930	2000	transhumanist, essayist
Fred Polak	1907	1985	social studies, wrote The Image of the Future
Freeman Dyson	1923	2020	nuclear engineering, disarmament advocate, ideas of Dyson sphere, nuclear space-flight
Gaston Berger	1896	1960	cognitive science
Gene Roddenberry	1921	1991	creator of the Star Trek franchise.
Genevieve Bell	1968	living	cultural anthropologist and technologist
George Dvorsky	1970	living	transhumanist
George Friedman	1949	living	geopolitics
George Gilder	1939	living	society
George Orwell	1903	1950	writer (wrote 1984)
Gerald Celente	1946	living	trend forecaster
Gerard K. O'Neill	1927	1992	envisioned space colonization
Gianroberto Casaleggio	1954	2016	politics, internet
Grace Hopper	1906	1992	women in computing, COBOL
H. G. Wells	1866	1946	writer, historian, among the first to think of himself as a futurist
Hans Moravec	1948	living	robotics, AI
Harlan Cleveland	1918	2008	diplomacy
Hazel Henderson	1933	2022	cooperative economics
Heiko Andreas von der Gracht	1978	living	educator, strategic foresight
Herman Kahn	1922	1983	military strategist, econo-technical predictions
Hugo de Garis	1947	living	AI
Hugo Gernsback	1884	1967	invented the term "science fiction", wrote the novel Ralph 124C 41+, started science fiction magazines. After him the Hugo Awards are named.
Isaac Arthur	1980	living	Long term future of the space industry and colonization, physicist, YouTube personality
Isaac Asimov	1920	1992	writer of science and science fiction, created the Three Laws of Robotics.
Jacque Fresco	1916	2017	architect, resource economics, model maker, envisioned of cornucopian world
James Hughes	1961	living	ethics
James Lovelock	1919	2022	environmentalist, Gaia hypothesis, Global warming theorist
Jean Fourastié	1907	1990	economist
John McHale	1922	1978	artist, sociologist
Jeremy Rifkin	1945	living	economist, science and tech. critic of various sorts, writer
Jerry Fishenden		living	Microsoft future
Jim Dator		living	politics
Joanne Pransky	1959	2023	robotics
Joël de Rosnay	1937	living	molecular biology
John Michael Godier		living	author, science communicator, futurist, YouTube personality
John Naisbitt	1929	2021	wrote Megatrends
José Luis Cordeiro	1962	living	engineer, economist, and author of La Muerte de la Muerte
Jules Verne	1828	1905	previsioned aviation, spaceflight, submarine travel
Karel Čapek	1890	1938	fiction writer who invented the word robot
Karl Marx	1818	1883	predicted societal and economic development on the basis of dialectical materialism
Kevin Kelly	1952	living	founding executive editor of Wired magazine and author of multiple futurology books
Kevin Warwick	1954	living	robotics
Kim Stanley Robinson	1952	living	novelist known for Mars Trilogy, 2312 (novel), Aurora (novel), and the forthcoming 'New York, 2140'
Krafft Arnold Ehricke	1917	1984	space colonization
Leonardo da Vinci	1452	1519	engineer, inventor, scientist
Lidewij Edelkoort	1950	living	fashion
M. G. Gordon	1915	1969	social studies
Magda Cordell McHale	1921	2008	painter, educator
Mahdi Elmandjra	1933	2014	economist, sociologist
Mark Pesce	1962	living	inventor, writer, engineer
Mark Satin	1946	living	political theory
Mark Stevenson	1971	living	author, entrepreneur, geo-technology
Marshall Brain	1961	2024	robotics, transhumanism
Marshall McLuhan	1911	1980	communications
Martin Ford	1963	living	artificial intelligence, robotics, author of New York Times bestseller Rise of the Robots: Technology and the Threat of a Jobless Future
Matthew Simmons	1943	2010	peak oil, oil reserves
Max More	1964	living	Extropy Institute
Meredith Thring	1915	2006	inventor
Michael Crichton	1942	2008	writer; implications of progress in science
Michael Rogers		living	New York Times futurist; MSNBC commentator
Michel Saloff Coste	1955	living	art, Club of Budapest
Michio Kaku	1947	living	string field theory, expositor
Mitchell Joachim	1972	living	ecological design Michel de Nostredame
Natasha Vita-More	1950	living	Humanity+
Neal Stephenson	1959	living	novelist known for Snow Crash, Anathem, and Seveneves
Nicholas Negroponte	1943	living	OLPC, new technological media
Nick Bostrom	1973	living	philosopher at the University of Oxford known for his work on existential risk, the anthropic principle, human enhancement ethics, superintelligence risks, the reversal test, and consequentialism
Nicolas De Santis	1966	living	Corporate Visioning, author, tech entrepreneur, founder Opodo
Nikola Tesla	1856	1943	energy, inventor
Nikolai Fyodorovich Fyodorov	1829	1903	renewable energy, life extension/immortality, tranhumanism, space colonization
Orrin H. Pilkey	1934	2024	critic of environmentalists, coastline erosion
Ossip K. Flechtheim	1909	1998	political scientist
Patrick Dixon	1957	living	business
Peter C. Bishop	1944	living	educator - strategic foresight
Peter Diamandis	1961	living	Singularity University
Peter Newman	1945	living	sustainability, transport systems, cars and cities
Peter Schwartz	1946	living	China, climate change, business, technology
Phil Salin	1949	1991	cyberspace and the Internet
Philip K. Dick	1928	1982	writer who produced the novels behind Blade Runner and Minority Report
Ray Kurzweil	1948	living	AI, transhumanism, technological singularity, life extension
Raymond Spencer Rodgers	1935	2007	telesphere, food-chain
Renzo Provinciali	1895	1981	anarchist
Richard Feynman	1918	1988	physicist, originator of concept of nanotechnology
Richard Moran	1950	living	social scientist
Richard Neville	1941	2016	author, reporter
Richard Slaughter	1940	living	sociologist
Robert A. Heinlein	1907	1988	novelist
Robert Anton Wilson	1932	2007	psychonaut, novelist, essayist
Robert Jastrow	1925	2008	NASA scientist, author, spaceflight
Robert Jungk	1913	1994	journalist
Robert Theobald	1929	1999	economics
Robin Hanson	1959	living	prediction markets, singularity, transhumanism
Roger Bacon	1220	1292	Franciscan Friar, Natural Philosopher
Ross Dawson	1962	living	futurist, speaker, author
Scott Smith	1967	living	"flatpack futures"
Sinead Bovell	1989	living	Blogger
Sohail Inayatullah	1958	living	political scientist
Stanisław Lem	1921	2006	novelist
Stephen Hawking	1942	2018	astrophysics, cosmology
Stewart Brand	1938	living	cognitive science, environmental philosophy, whole systems
Sydney Jay Mead	1933	2019	visual futurist
Terence McKenna	1946	2000	philosopher, psychonaut, speaker, ethnobotanist
Ted Nelson	1937	living	writer, philosopher, creator of hypertext concept and Xanadu project
Theodore Modis	1943	living	business, physics
Thomas Frey	1954	living	futurist speaker, technology, future jobs, future of work, future crimes, future of transportation, unanswerable question
Tim Cannon	1979	living	technology, transhumanist
Timothy Leary	1920	1996	psychologist, psychedelics enthusiast, transhumanist, space migration, life extension
Vannevar Bush	1890	1974	analog computing, envisioned Memex, similar to what the internet is now
W. Warren Wagar	1932	2004	historian
Walt Disney	1901	1966	filmmaker, businessman, created "Tomorrowland" and a concept Experimental Prototype Community of Tomorrow (referred to by acronym EPCOT)
Walter Greiling	1900	1986	chemist, sociologist
Warren Ellis	1968	living	writer
Wendell Bell	1924	2019	sociology
William Gibson	1948	living	novelist (cyberpunk)
William Gilpin	1813	1894	politician
Willis Harman	1918	1997	sociocultural evolution
Ziauddin Sardar	1951	living	Muslim thought

== See also ==
- Futures studies
- Outline of futures studies
- World Future Society
