= Robert MacFarlan Cole III =

American chemical engineer (1889–1986)

- Born: December 26, 1889; Chicago, Illinois
- Died: January 18, 1986 (aged 96); Bryn Athyn, Pennsylvania
- Education: University of Illinois Urbana-Champaign (SB); University of Chicago (PhD)
- Spouse: Wertha Pendleton
- Children: William P. Cole; Dandridge M. Cole; Aubrey Cole Odhner; Robert H. P. Cole

Robert MacFarlan Cole III (December 26, 1889 – January 18, 1986) was an American chemical engineer, inventor, and author. He helped develop many chemicals, including freon and its use as a refrigerant and an aerosol repellent, a substance to counteract poisonous gas in World War I, synthetic rubber and pyrethrin insecticides in World War II, and ethylene oxide as a hospital germicide.

== Biography ==
Cole graduated from the University of Illinois Urbana-Champaign with a Bachelor of Science degree in Chemistry in 1913 and from the University of Chicago with a Doctor of Philosophy degree in Chemistry in 1937. His doctorate dissertation was titled "The Stieglitz Theory of Color Production".

He married, on October 26, 1918, Wertha Pendleton, the daughter of William Frederic Pendleton, the founding bishop of the General Church of the New Jerusalem (Swedenborgian Faith). Their children included: William P. Cole, Dandridge M. Cole, Aubrey Cole Odhner, and the Rev. Robert H. P. Cole.

He became the founder and first president of Hord Color Products in Sandusky, Ohio in 1920. There he helped pioneer color processes and products. In 1928, Mr. Cole went to work for the American Dyewood Co. in Chester, Pa., where he developed recycling of the paper in telephone directories.

Cole reported to the E. I. du Pont de Nemours and Company that he had witnessed chlorofluorocarbon, considered a poisonous gas, being used safely in Germany. A duPont chemist, William Warren Rhodes, and Mr. Cole worked on the development of the gas, to which duPont gave the trade name Freon. "I was there when the first seven cc's of Freon came out of the distilling apparatus in Sandusky, Ohio" He told a Pennsylvania newspaper.

During World War II, Mr. Cole was a member of the War Chemical Board and pioneered the artificial synthesis of pyrethrin, used as an insecticide by the U.S. Navy in the South Pacific. He died on January 18, 1986.

== Bibliography ==
- Stieglitz Theory of Color Production Chicago, 1937.
