= SFIA =

SFIA may refer to:

- San Francisco International Airport, in the United States
- Skills Framework for the Information Age, originating from the United Kingdom, now established as the de facto global IT and digital skills framework
- SfiA, a.k.a. SulA, an SOS response protein
- Science & Futurism with Isaac Arthur
