= Wertha Pendleton Cole =

American astronomer (1891–1959)

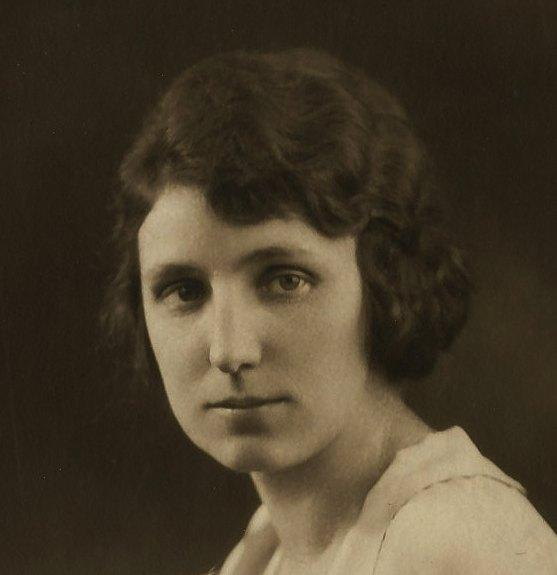
- Born: January 18, 1891
- Died: January 1, 1959 (aged 67)
- Education: Columbia University (1914); University of Virginia
- Occupation: Dean of Women from 1943 to 1958
- Employer: Bryn Athyn College
- Spouse: Robert MacFarlan Cole III
- Children: William P. Cole; Dandridge M. Cole; Aubrey Cole Odhner; Robert H. P. Cole
- Parent(s): William Frederic Pendleton; Mary Lawson Young

Wertha Pendleton Cole (January 18, 1891 – January 1, 1959) was an American educational administrator and astronomer.

== Biography ==
She was born on January 18, 1891, to William Frederic Pendleton. He was the founding bishop of the General Church of the New Jerusalem. She received her Bachelor of Science degree from Columbia University in 1914. As part of her graduate work at the University of Virginia, in 1917-1918, she did parallax observations for Prof. Samuel Alfred Mitchell at the McCormick Observatory. She was the Dean of Women at Bryn Athyn College from 1943 to 1958 and also headed the astronomy department. She organized the Bryn Athyn team for Operation Moonwatch explaining: "I wanted to do something practical for the International Geophysical Year. I felt this was the best way to help." She was a member of the Rittenhouse Astronomical Society from 1935 to 1959, serving as its secretary 1950-1951.

She died on January 1, 1959.

== Family ==
Her husband Robert MacFarlan Cole III was a chemist, and one of her sons, Dandridge M. Cole, was a space rocket designer.

== Publications ==
- "Ancient Astronomy and Astrology," The Journal of Education, 1931, 27-35.
- "Swedenborg's Work on the Longitude," The New Philosophy, 1933, 169-178.
