= Space settlement =

Type of space station, intended as a permanent settlement

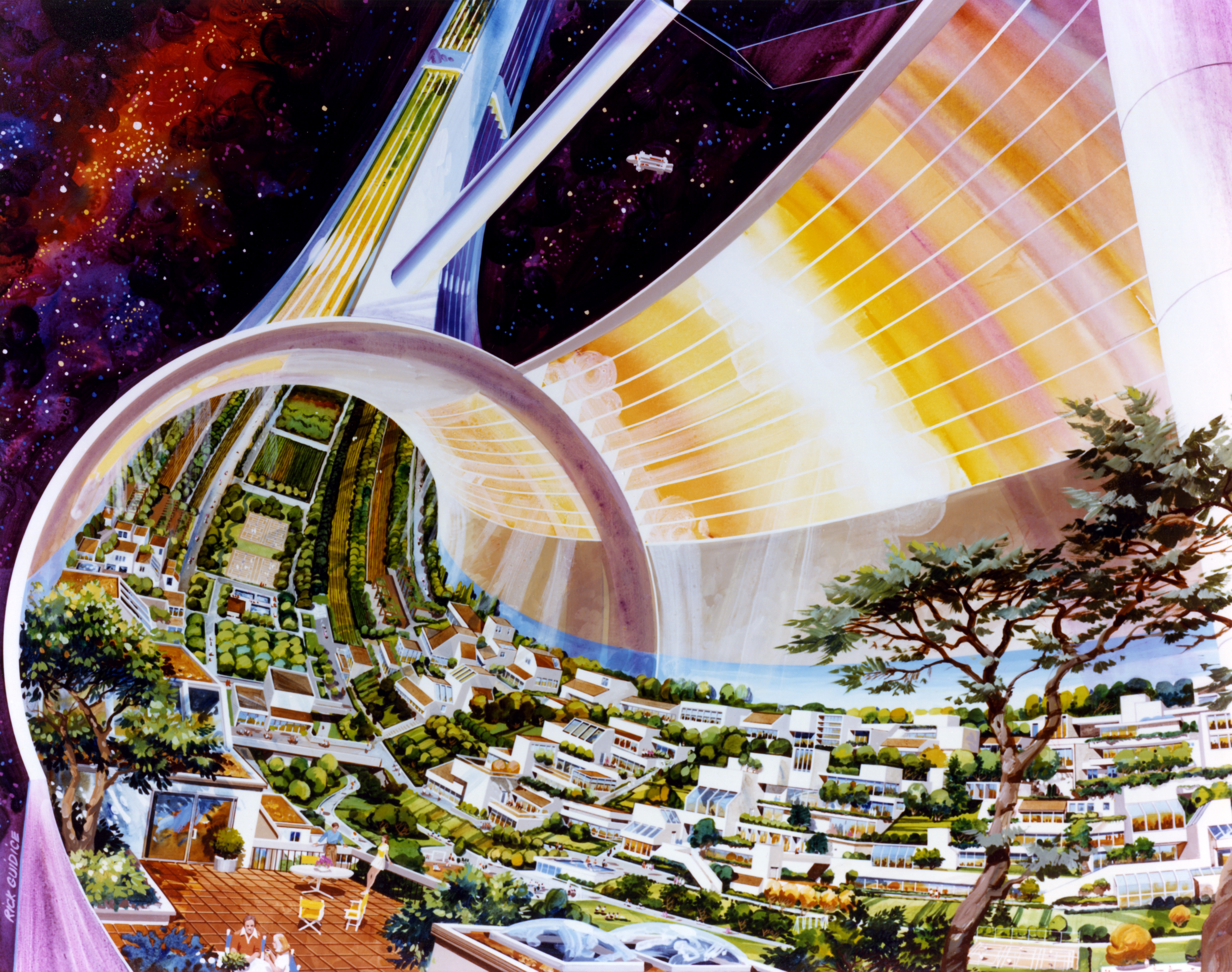
A Stanford torus interior (cutaway view)

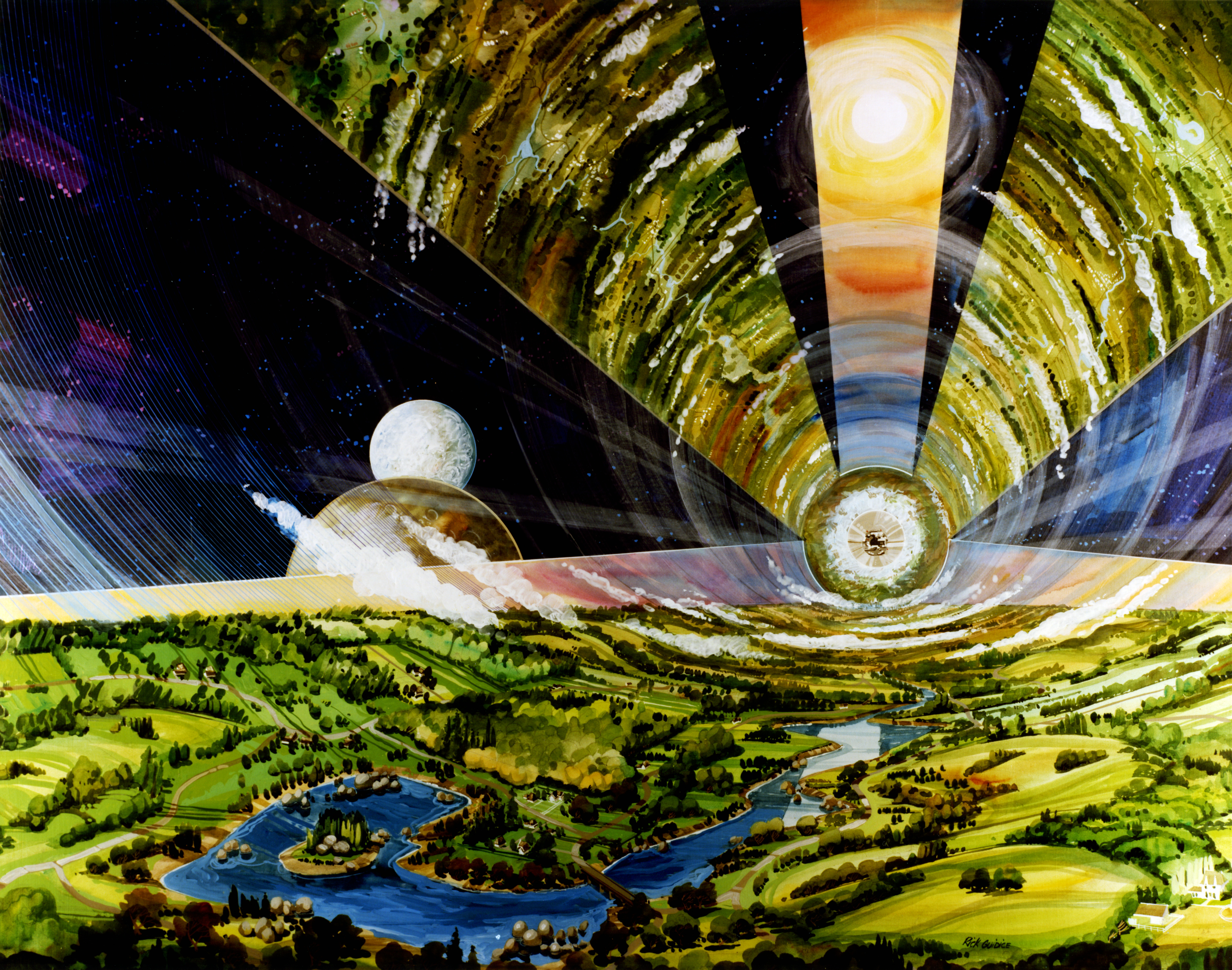
Interior view of a large scale O'Neill cylinder, showing alternating land and window stripes

A space settlement (also called a space habitat, spacestead, space city or space colony) is a settlement in outer space, sustaining more extensively habitation facilities in space than a general space station or spacecraft. Possibly including closed ecological systems, its particular purpose is permanent habitation.

No space settlement has been constructed yet, but many design concepts, with varying degrees of realism, have been introduced in science-fiction or proposed for actual realization.

Space settlements include orbital settlements (also called orbital habitat, orbital stead, orbital city or orbital colony) around the Earth or any other celestial body, as well as cyclers and interstellar arks, as generation ships or world ships.

Space settlements are a form of extraterrestrial settlements, which more broadly includes habitats built on or within a body other than Earth, such as a settlement developed from a moonbase, a Mars habitat or an asteroid.

== Definition ==
A space settlement is any large-scale habitation facility in outer space, or more particularly in an orbit.

The International Astronautical Federation has differentiated space settlements to space habitats and space infrastructure the following way:

- Habitat: pressurized volume(s) within which humans live and work, including relevant facilities for life support.
- Settlement: group of permanently inhabited habitats installed near each other, possibly interconnected.
- Infrastructure: set of constructed elements supporting habitats and/or settlements such as (and not limited to): power plant, water plant, greenhouse and waste management facilities, communication facilities, transportation facilities, EVAs, roads, spaceport, research platforms, and so on.

While not automatically constituting a colonial entity, a space settlement can be an element of a space colony. The term "space colony" has been viewed critically, prompting Carl Sagan to propose the term space city.

== History ==
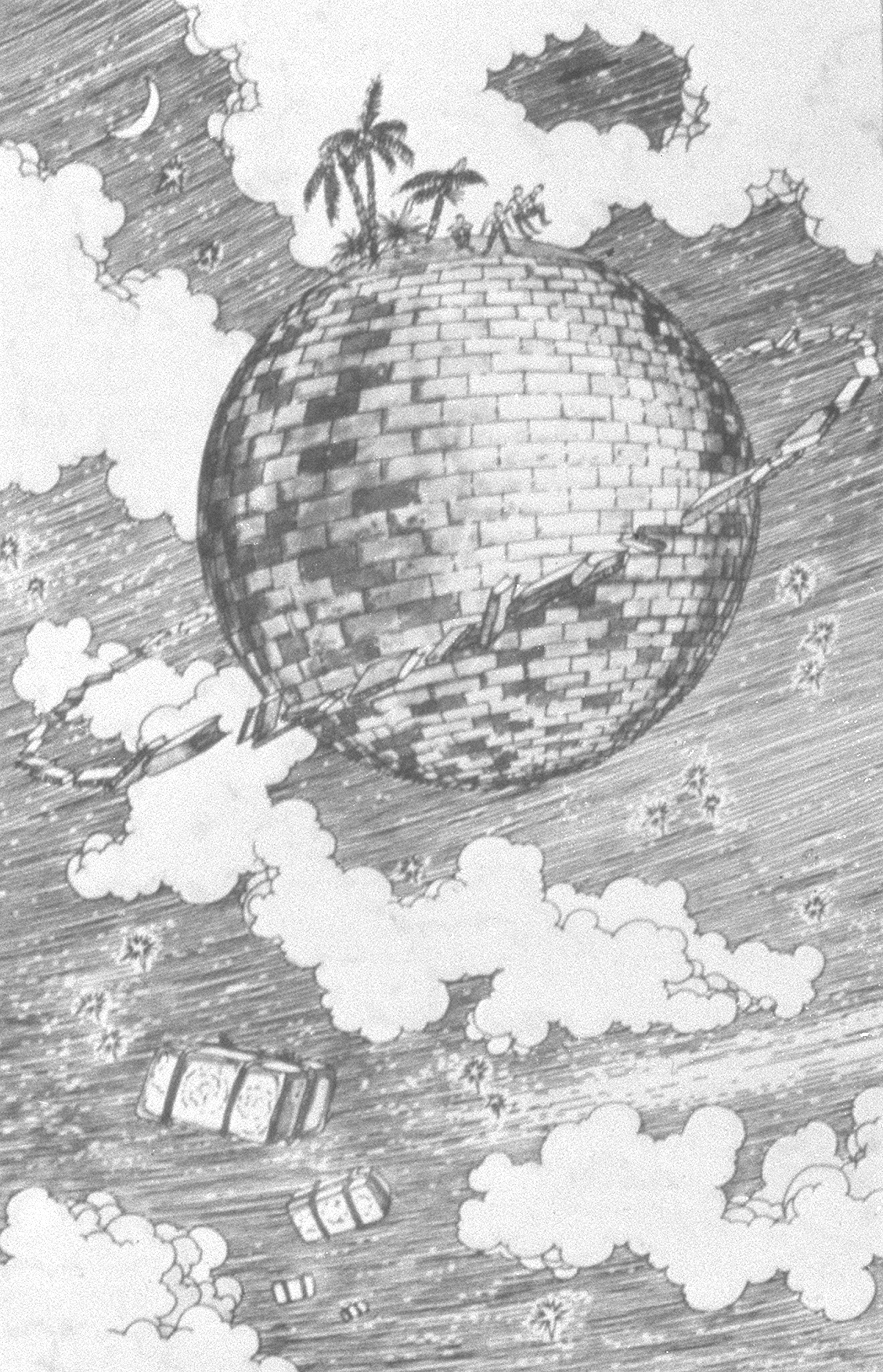
"The Brick Moon" – an 1869 serial by Edward Everett Hale – was the first fictional space station or habitat. (Described by other sources as a station or habitat.)

The idea of space settlements either in fact or fiction goes back to the second half of the 19th century. "The Brick Moon", a fictional story written in 1869 by Edward Everett Hale, is perhaps the first treatment of this idea in writing.

In 1903, space pioneer Konstantin Tsiolkovsky speculated about rotating cylindrical space settlements in Beyond Planet Earth. In 1929 John Desmond Bernal speculated about giant space settlements. Dandridge M. Cole in the late 1950s and 1960s speculated about hollowing out asteroids and then rotating them to use as settlements in various magazine articles and books, notably Islands In Space: The Challenge Of The Planetoids.

=== O'Neill – The High Frontier ===
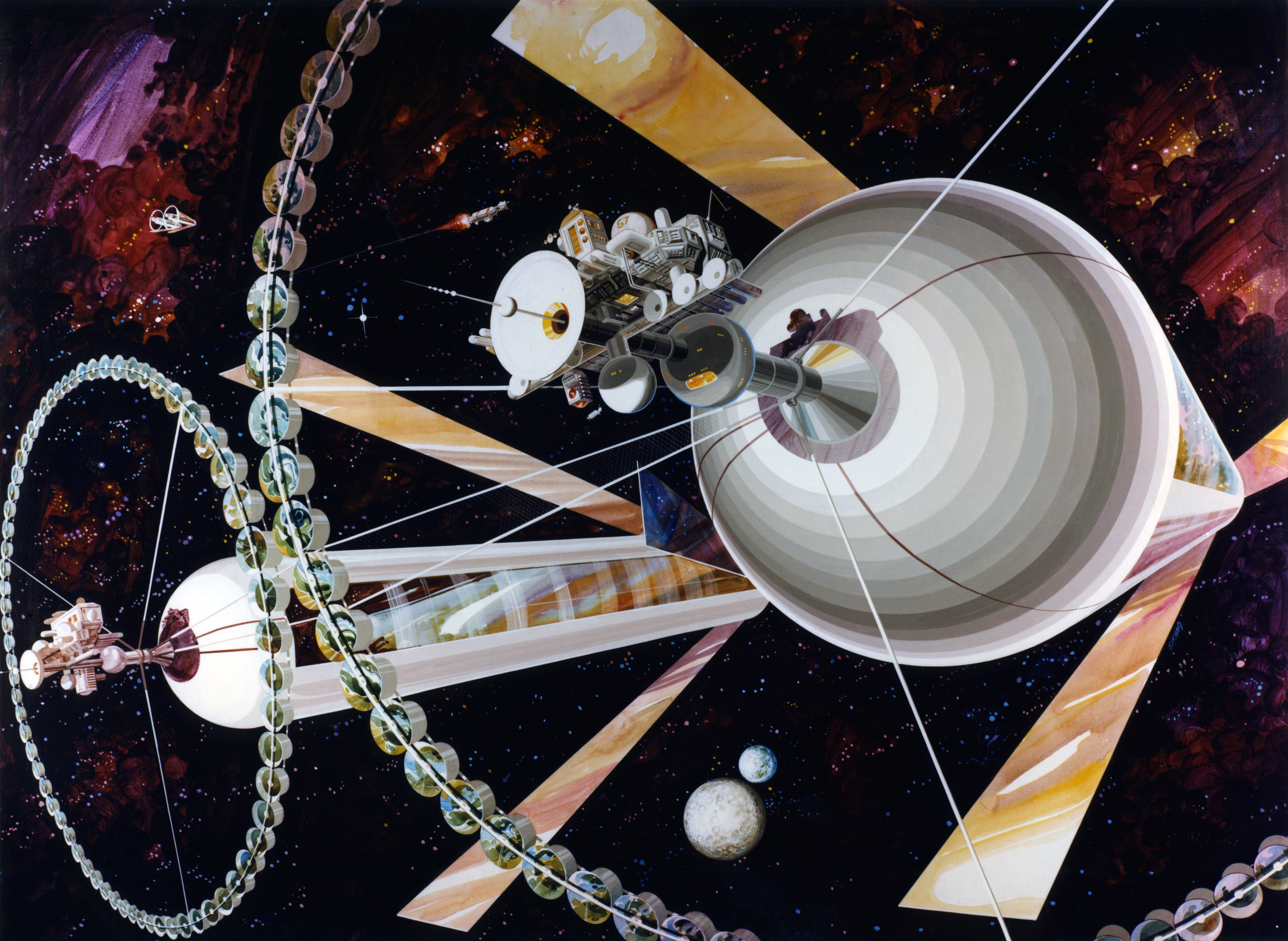
A pair of O'Neill cylinders

Around 1970, near the end of Project Apollo (1961–1972), Gerard K. O'Neill, an experimental physicist at Princeton University, was looking for a topic to tempt his physics students, most of them freshmen in engineering. He hit upon the idea of assigning them feasibility calculations for large space-settlements. To his surprise, the habitats seemed feasible even in very large sizes: cylinders 8 km (5 mi) in diameter and 32 km (20 mi) long, even if made from ordinary materials such as steel and glass. Also, the students solved problems such as radiation protection from cosmic rays (almost free in the larger sizes), getting naturalistic Sun angles, provision of power, realistic pest-free farming and orbital attitude control without reaction motors. O'Neill published an article about these colony concepts in Physics Today in 1974. He expanded the article in his 1976 book The High Frontier: Human Colonies in Space.

==== NASA Ames/Stanford 1975 Summer Study ====
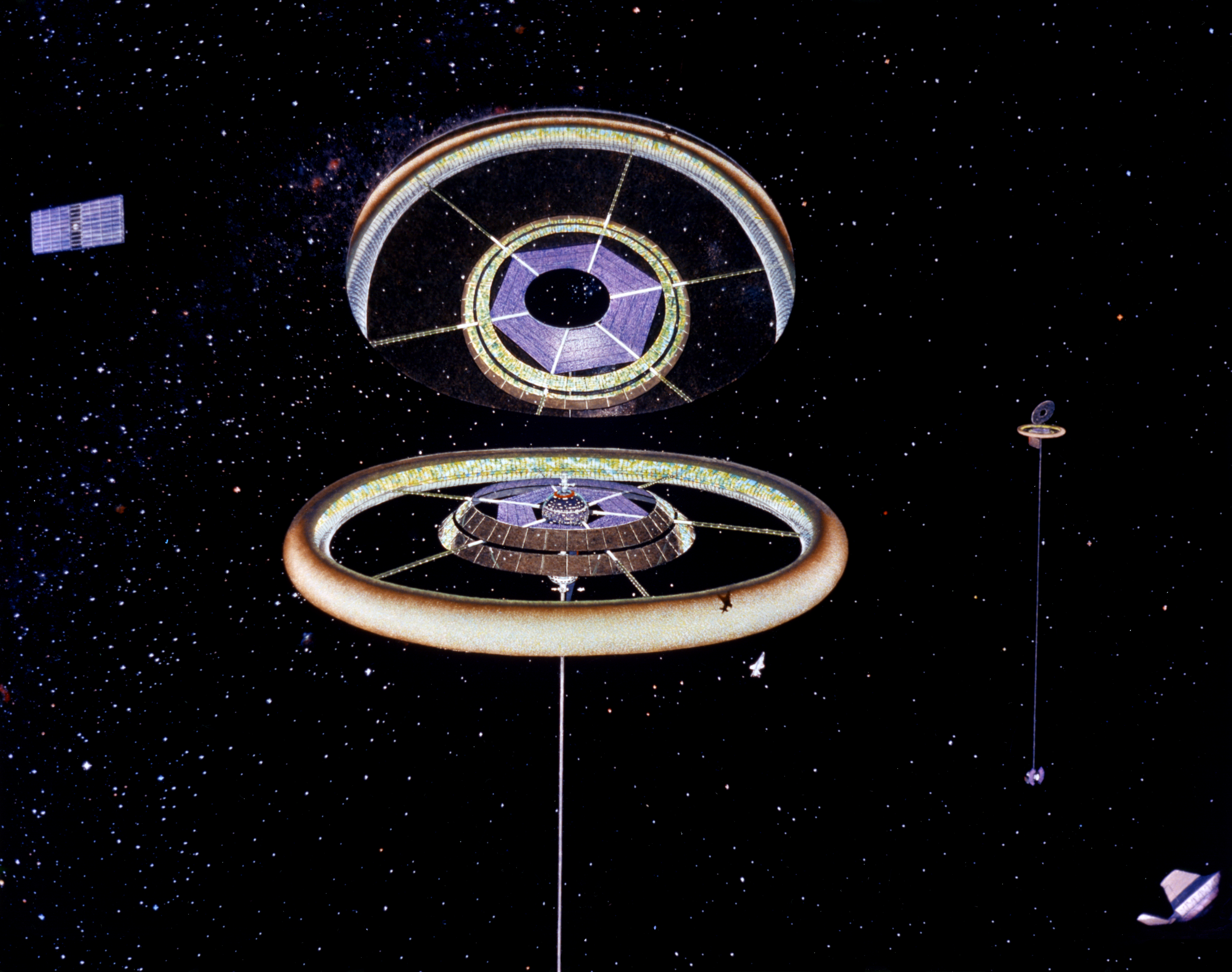
Stanford torus exterior

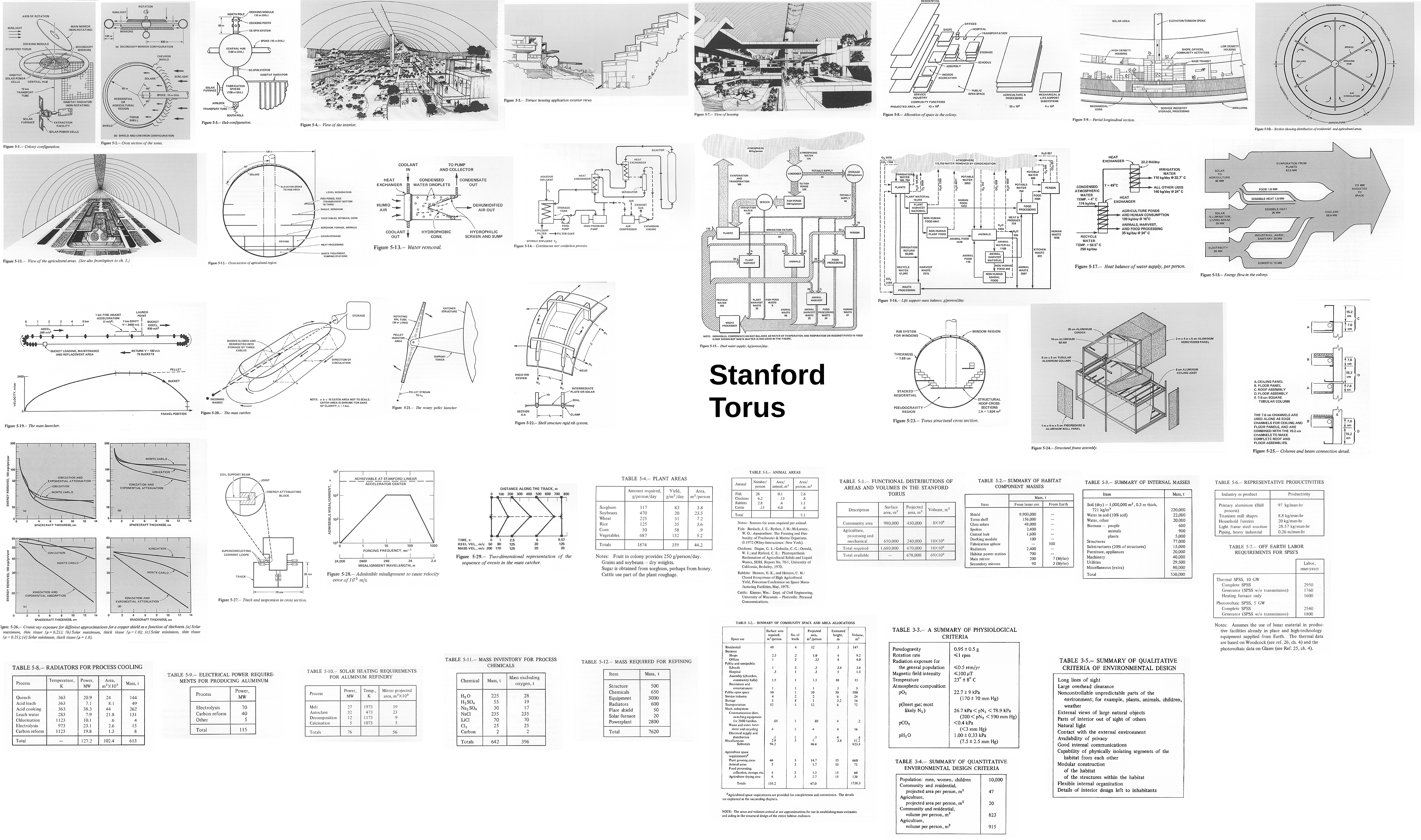
Collage of figures and tables of Stanford Torus space habitat, from «Space Settlements: A Design Study» book. Charles Holbrow and Richard D. Johnson, NASA, 1977.

The result motivated NASA to sponsor a couple of summer workshops led by O'Neill. Several concepts were studied, with sizes ranging from 1,000 to 10,000,000 people, including versions of the Stanford torus. Three concepts were presented to NASA: the Bernal Sphere, the Toroidal Colony and the Cylindrical Colony.

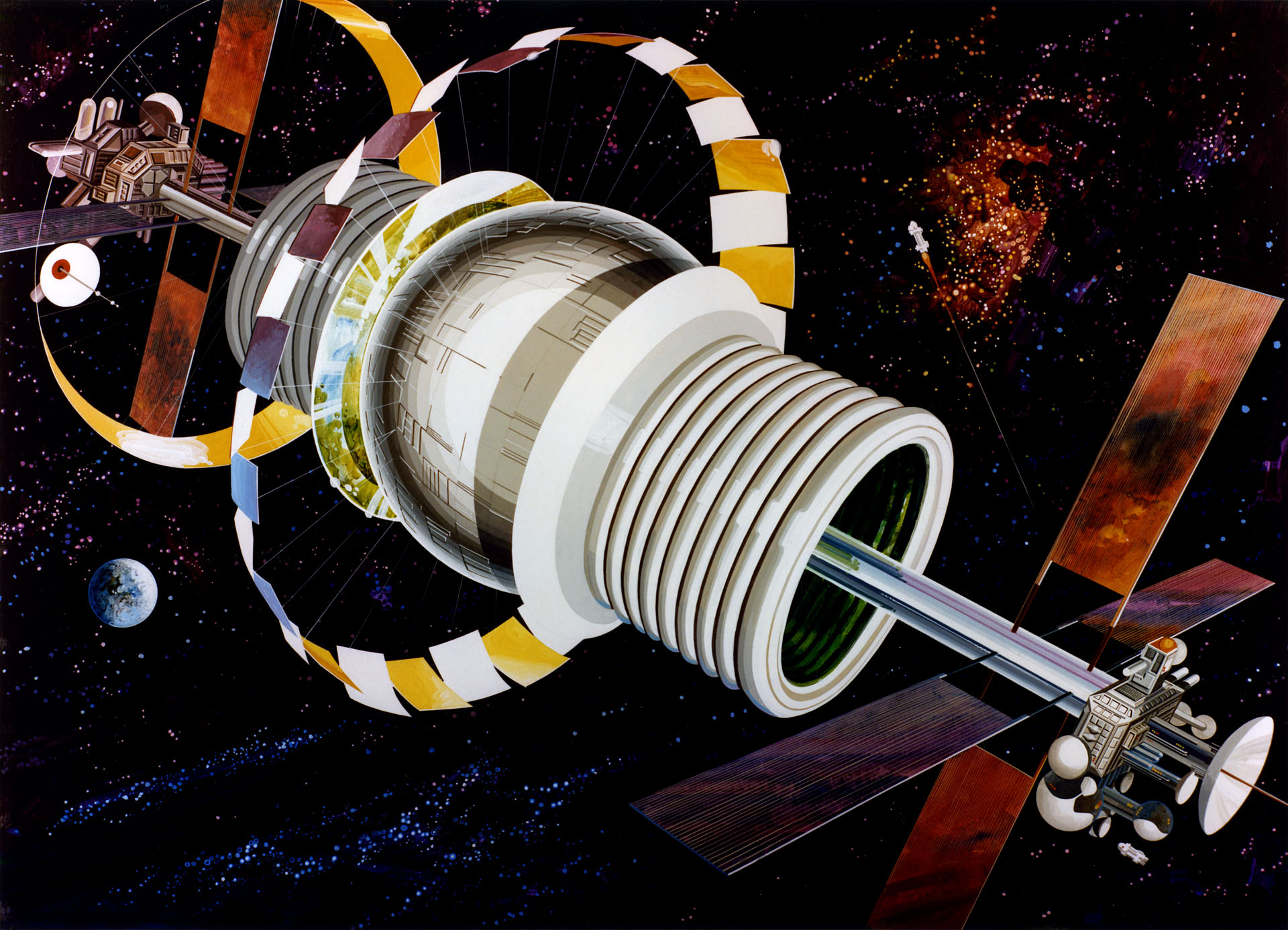
Exterior of a 1970s Stanford adaptation of the Bernal sphere

O'Neill's concepts had an example of a payback scheme: construction of solar power satellites from lunar materials. O'Neill did not emphasize the building of solar power satellites as such, but rather offered proof that orbital manufacturing from lunar materials could generate profits. He and other participants presumed that once such manufacturing facilities had started production, many profitable uses for them would be found, and the colony would become self-supporting and begin to build other colonies as well.

The concept studies generated a notable groundswell of public interest. One effect of this expansion was the founding of the L5 Society in the U.S., a group of enthusiasts that desired to build and live in such colonies. The group was named after the space-colony orbit which was then believed to be the most profitable, a kidney-shaped orbit around either of Earth's lunar Lagrange points 5 or 4.

==== Space Studies Institute ====
In 1977 O'Neill founded the Space Studies Institute, which initially funded and constructed some prototypes of the new hardware needed for a space colonization effort, as well as producing a number of feasibility studies. One of the early projects, for instance, involved a series of functional prototypes of a mass driver, the essential technology for moving ores efficiently from the Moon to space colony orbits.

== Motivation ==
There are a range of arguments for space settlements, including:

- As a base for crewed space exploration
- Relieving Earth of industry and population pressure
- Recreational habitation, either as visitors or residents at space (see space hotel)
- Economic growth, developing access to resources in space and a space economy, without destroying ecosystems and displacing peoples on Earth
- Space colonization, claiming extraterrestrial space for settler colonial independence
- For survival of human civilization and the biosphere, in case of a disaster on the Earth (natural or man-made)

== Advantages ==
A number of arguments are made for space settlements having a number of advantages:

=== Access to solar energy ===
Space has an abundance of light produced from the Sun. In Earth orbit, this amounts to 1400 watts of power per square meter. This energy can be used to produce electricity from solar cells or heat engine based power stations, process ores, provide light for plants to grow and to warm space settlements.

=== Outside gravity well ===
Earth-to-space settlement trade would be easier than Earth-to-planetary habitat trade, as habitats orbiting Earth will not have a gravity well to overcome to export to Earth, and a smaller gravity well to overcome to import from Earth.

=== In-situ resource utilization ===
Space settlements may be supplied with resources from extraterrestrial places like Mars, asteroids, or the Moon (in-situ resource utilization [ISRU]; see Asteroid mining). One could produce breathing oxygen, drinking water, and rocket fuel with the help of ISRU. It may become possible to manufacture solar panels from lunar materials.

=== Asteroids and other small bodies ===
Most asteroids have a mixture of materials, that could be mined, and because these bodies do not have substantial gravity wells, it would require low delta-V to draw materials from them and haul them to a construction site.

There is estimated to be enough material in the main asteroid belt alone to build enough space settlements to equal the habitable surface area of 3,000 Earths.

=== Population ===
A 1974 estimate assumed that collection of all the material in the main asteroid belt would allow habitats to be constructed to give an immense total population capacity. Using the free-floating resources of the Solar System, this estimate extended into the trillions.

=== Zero g recreation ===
If a large area at the rotation axis is enclosed, various zero-g sports are possible, including swimming, hang gliding and the use of human-powered aircraft.

=== Passenger compartment ===
A space settlement can be the passenger compartment of a large spacecraft for colonizing asteroids, moons, and planets. It can also function as one for a generation ship for travel to other planets or distant stars (L. R. Shepherd described a generation starship in 1952 comparing it to a small planet with many people living in it.)

== Requirements ==
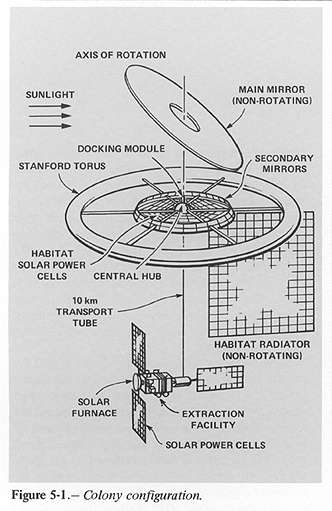
Configuration of a Stanford torus

The requirements for a space settlement are many. They would have to provide all the material needs for hundreds or thousands of humans, in an environment out in space that is very hostile to human life.

=== Regulation ===
The governance or regulation of space settlements is crucial for responsible habitation conditions. The physical as well as socio-political architecture of a space settlement, if poorly established, can lead to tyrannical and precarious conditions.

=== Initial capital outlay ===
Even the smallest of the settlement designs mentioned below are more massive than the total mass of all items that humans have ever launched into Earth orbit combined. Prerequisites to building settlements are either cheaper launch costs or a mining and manufacturing base on the Moon or other body having low delta-v from the desired habitat location.

=== Location ===
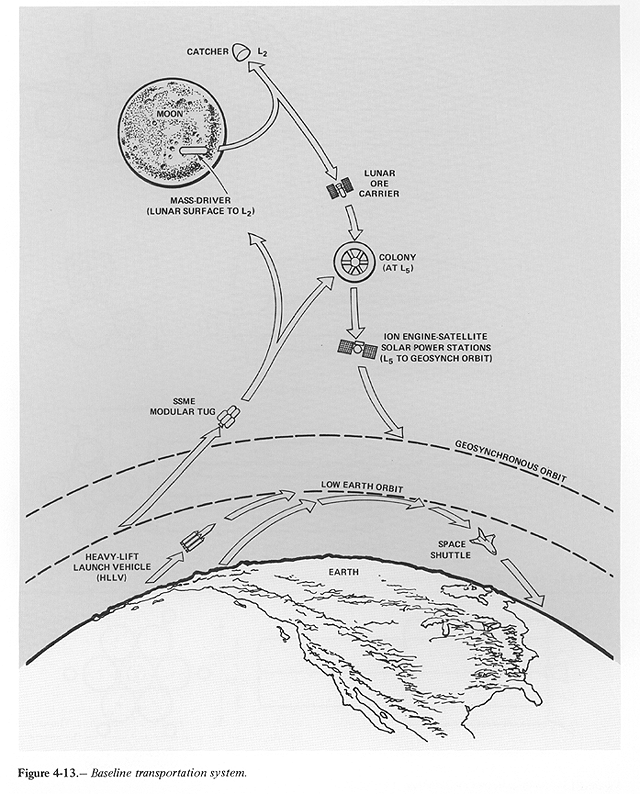
A 1970s NASA concept for routs and locating a Stanford torus in cis-lunar space

The optimal settlement orbits are still debated, and so orbital stationkeeping is probably a commercial issue. The lunar L_{4} and L_{5} orbits are now thought to be too far away from the Moon and Earth. A more modern proposal is to use a two-to-one resonance orbit that alternately has a close, low-energy (cheap) approach to the Moon, and then to the Earth. This provides quick, inexpensive access to both raw materials and the major market. Most settlement designs plan to use electromagnetic tether propulsion, or mass drivers used instead of rocket motors. The advantage of these is that they either use no reaction mass at all, or use cheap reaction mass.

=== Protection from radiation ===
If a space settlement is located at L_{4} or L_{5}, then its orbit will take it outside of the protection of the Earth's magnetosphere for approximately two-thirds of the time (as happens with the Moon), putting residents at risk of proton exposure from the solar wind (see Health threat from cosmic rays).

Protection can be attained through passive or active shielding. Current spacecraft are passively shielded by materials.

Water walls or ice walls can provide protection from solar and cosmic radiation, as 7 cm of water depth blocks approximately half of incident radiation. Alternatively, rock could be used as shielding; 4 metric tons per square meter of surface area could reduce radiation dosage to several mSv or less annually, below the rate of some populated high natural background areas on Earth.

Alternative concepts based on active shielding are untested yet and more complex than such passive mass shielding, but usage of magnetic and/or electric fields, like through spacecraft encapsulating wires, to deflect particles could potentially greatly reduce mass requirements.

=== Atmosphere ===
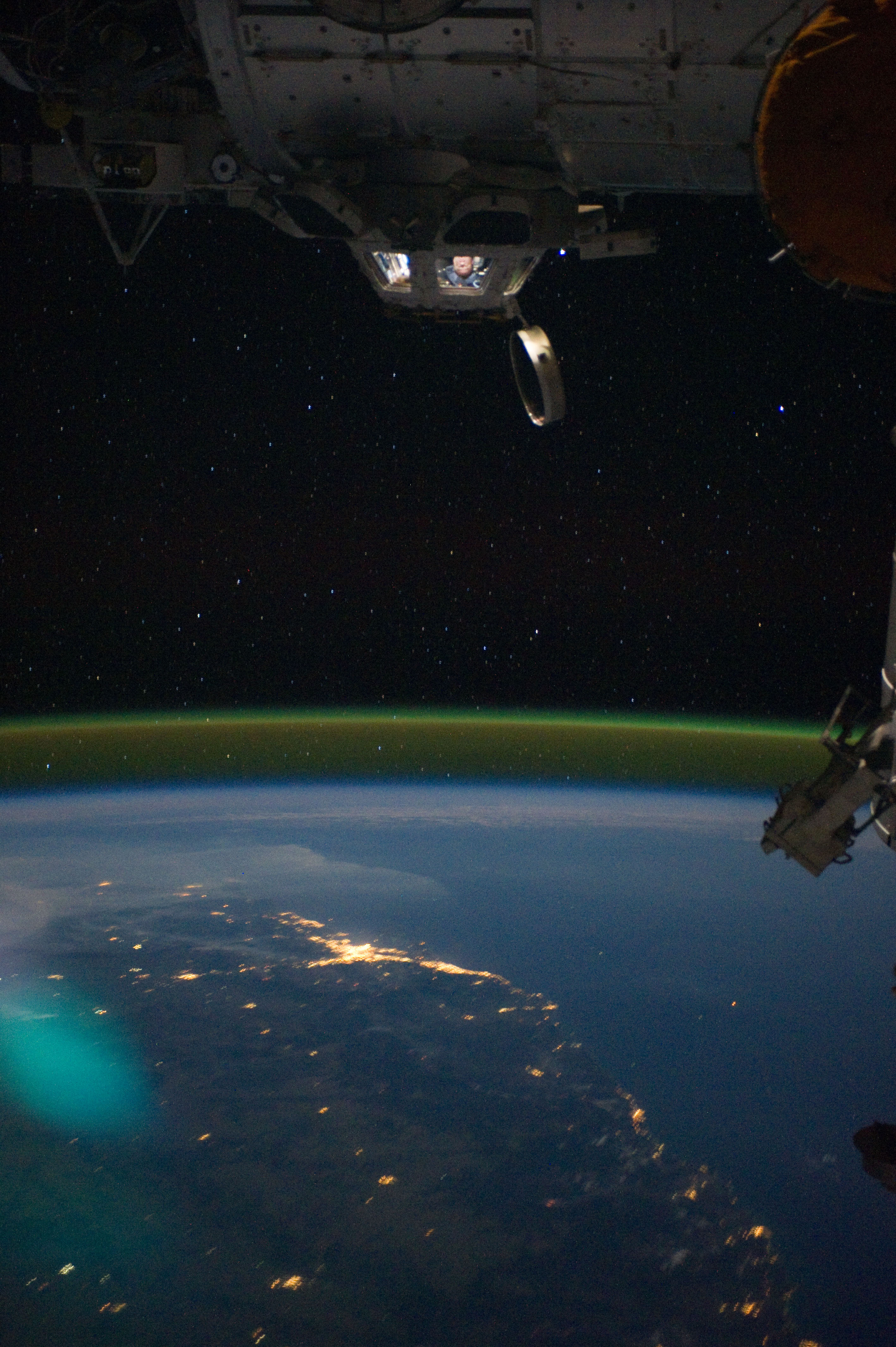
The airglow above the horizon at the atmospheric and orbital boundary to space, captured from the ISS

Air pressure, with normal partial pressures of oxygen (21%), carbon dioxide and nitrogen (78%), is a basic requirement of any space settlement. Basically, most space settlement designs concepts envision large, thin-walled pressure vessels. The required oxygen could be obtained from lunar rock. Nitrogen is most easily available from the Earth, but is also recycled nearly perfectly. Also, nitrogen in the form of ammonia (NH_{3}) may be obtainable from comets and the moons of outer planets. Nitrogen may also be available in unknown quantities on certain other bodies in the outer Solar System. The air of a habitat could be recycled in a number of ways. One concept is to use photosynthetic gardens, possibly via hydroponics, or forest gardening. However, these do not remove certain industrial pollutants, such as volatile oils, and excess simple molecular gases. The standard method used on nuclear submarines, a similar form of closed environment, is to use a catalytic burner, which effectively decomposes most organics. Further protection might be provided by a small cryogenic distillation system which would gradually remove impurities such as mercury vapor, and noble gases that cannot be catalytically burned.

=== Food production ===
Organic materials for food production would also need to be provided. At first, most of these would have to be imported from Earth. After that, feces recycling should reduce the need for imports. One proposed recycling method would start by burning the cryogenic distillate, plants, garbage and sewage with air in an electric arc, and distilling the result. The resulting carbon dioxide and water would be immediately usable in agriculture. The nitrates and salts in the ash could be dissolved in water and separated into pure minerals. Most of the nitrates, potassium and sodium salts would recycle as fertilizers. Other minerals containing iron, nickel, and silicon could be chemically purified in batches and reused industrially. The small fraction of remaining materials, well below 0.01% by weight, could be processed into pure elements with zero-gravity mass spectrometry, and added in appropriate amounts to the fertilizers and industrial stocks. It is likely that methods would be greatly refined as people began to actually live in space settlements.

=== Artificial gravity ===
Long-term on-orbit studies have proven that zero gravity weakens bones and muscles, and affects astronaut's calcium metabolism and immune systems. Many astronauts experience sinus problems or nasal congestion.

Habitat designs can involve rotation, in order to use inertial forces to simulate gravity. Scientific studies have been undertaken to study plant growth and responses within artificial gravity.

Above 2 to 6 RPM, centrifuges become uncomfortable for their occupants. Furthermore, small centrifuge radii are associated with motion sickness. Experienced centrifuge inhabitants can determine "spinward" and "antispinward" directions.

=== Meteoroids and dust ===
The habitat would need to withstand potential impacts from space debris, meteoroids, dust, etc. Most meteoroids that strike the earth vaporize in the atmosphere. Without a thick protective atmosphere meteoroid strikes would pose a much greater risk to a space settlement.

In some designs (O'Neill/NASA Ames "Stanford Torus" and "Crystal palace in a Hatbox") habitat designs have a non-rotating cosmic ray shield of packed sand (~1.9 m thick) or even artificial aggregate rock (1.7 m ersatz concrete). Other proposals use the rock as structure and integral shielding (O'Neill, "the High Frontier". Sheppard, "Concrete Space Colonies"; Spaceflight, journal of the B.I.S.). In any of these cases, strong meteoroid protection is implied by the external radiation shell ~4.5 tonnes of rock material, per square meter.

Note that Solar Power Satellites are proposed in the multi-GW ranges, and such energies and technologies would allow constant radar mapping of nearby 3D space out-to arbitrarily far away, limited only by effort expended to do so.

Proposals are available to move even kilometer-sized NEOs to high Earth orbits, and reaction engines for such purposes would move a space settlement and any arbitrarily large shield, but not in any timely or rapid manner, the thrust being very low compared to the huge mass.

=== Heat rejection ===
The habitat is in a vacuum, and therefore resembles a giant thermos bottle. Habitats also need a radiator to eliminate heat from absorbed sunlight. Very small habitats might have a central vane that rotates with the habitat. In this design, convection would raise hot air "up" (toward the center), and cool air would fall down into the outer habitat. Some other designs would distribute coolants, such as chilled water from a central radiator.

=== Attitude control ===
Most mirror geometries require something on the habitat to be aimed at the Sun and so attitude control is necessary. The original O'Neill design used the two cylinders as momentum wheels to roll the colony, and pushed the sunward pivots together or apart to use precession to change their angle.

=== Interior design ===
The interior of a space settlement should always have areas out of sight, to avoid the psychological effect of all reality being visible simultaneously, while also allowing for landscapes and wide vistas, so there is no sensation of living in a theater stage-like situation. Because of psychological reasons, the design should also avoid the perception that everything is human-controlled (for example, by having random artificial weather, or vegetation developing in a natural way).

== Concepts ==
=== Base concepts ===
The two common original concepts are the Bernal sphere and the O'Neill cylinder.

==== Dumbbell-shape assembly concept ====
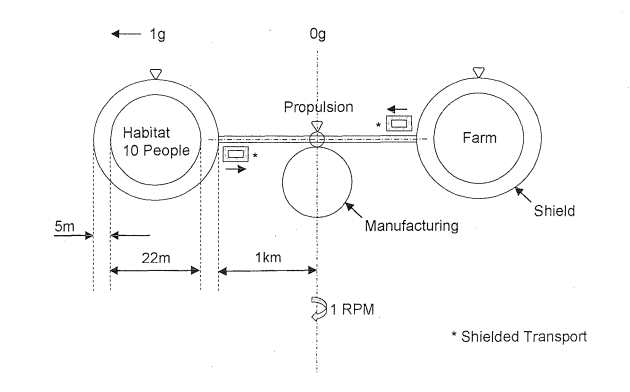
A dumbbell-shaped self-sufficient and self-reproducible habitat for 10 persons

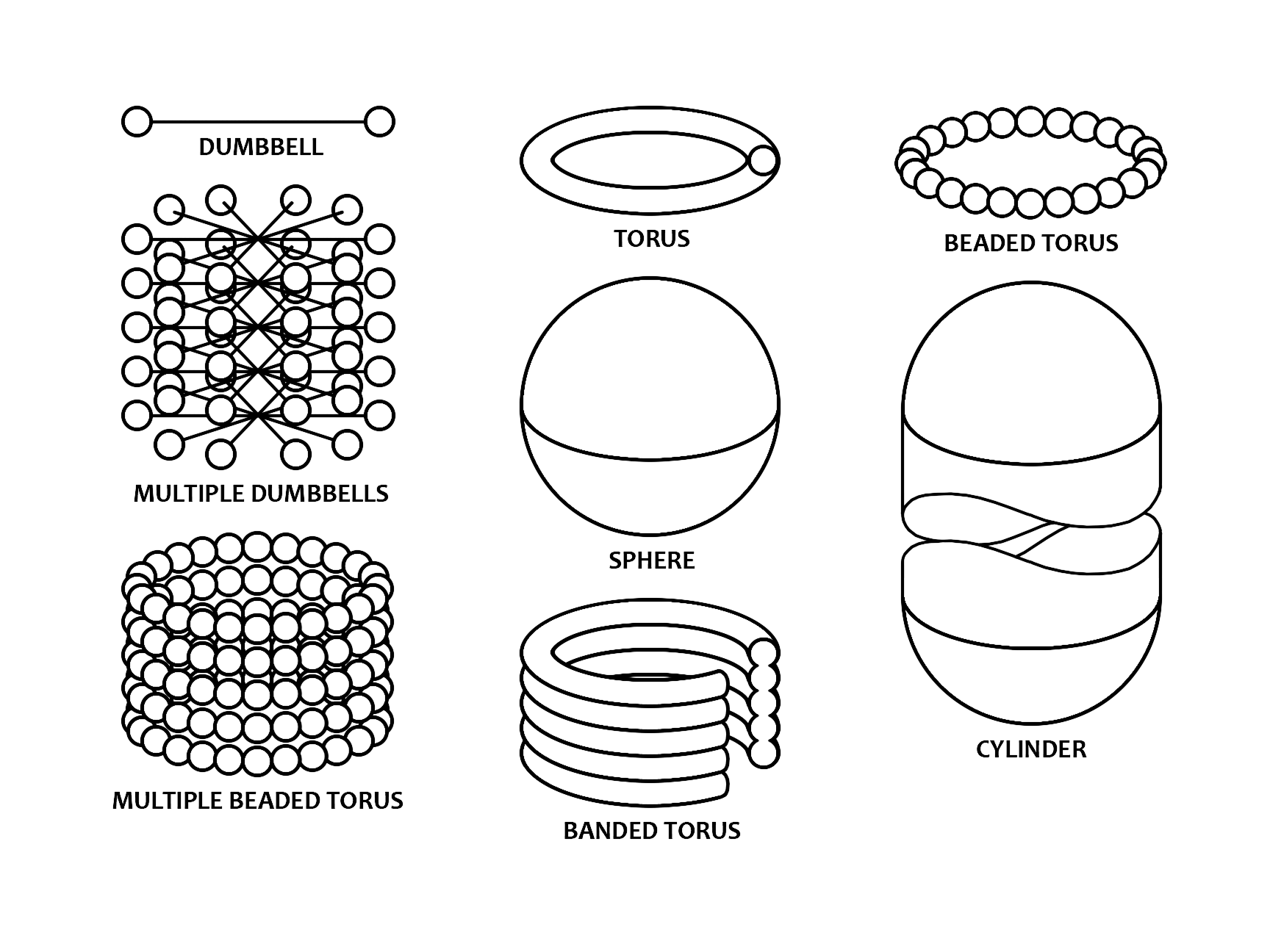
Various concepts merging into a cylindrical station

A dumbbell-like spacecraft or habitat, connected by a cable to a counterweight or other habitat. This design has been proposed as a Mars ship, initial construction shack for a space habitat, and orbital hotel. It has a comfortably long and slow rotational radius for a relatively small station mass. Also, if some of the equipment can form the counter-weight, the equipment dedicated to artificial gravity is just a cable, and thus has a much smaller mass-fraction than in other concepts. For a long-term habitation, however, radiation shielding must rotate with the habitat, and is extremely heavy, thus requiring a much stronger and heavier cable. This speculative design was also considered by the NASA studies. Small habitats would be mass-produced to standards that allow the habitats to interconnect. A single habitat can operate alone as a bola. However, further habitats can be attached, to grow into a "dumbbell" then a "bow-tie", then a ring, then a cylinder of "beads", and finally a framed array of cylinders. Each stage of growth shares more radiation shielding and capital equipment, increasing redundancy and safety while reducing the cost per person. This concept was originally proposed by a professional architect because it can grow much like Earth-bound cities, with incremental individual investments, unlike those that require large start-up investments. The main disadvantage is that the smaller versions use a large structure to support the radiation shielding, which rotates with them. In large sizes, the shielding becomes economical, because it grows roughly as the square of the colony radius. The number of people, their habitats, and the radiators to cool them grow roughly as the cube of the colony radius.

=== Further concepts ===
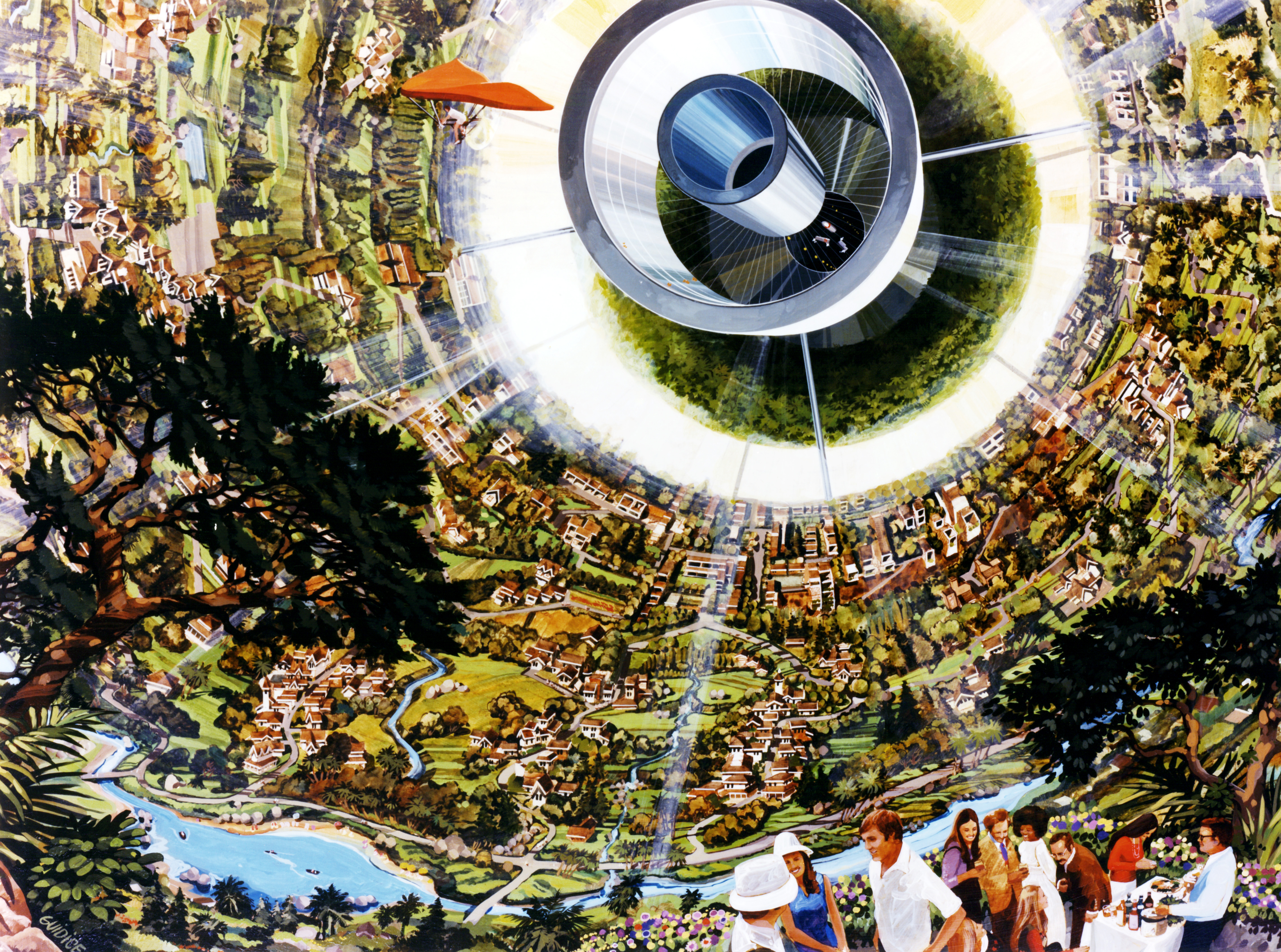
Interior of a Bernal sphere

- Island One, a Bernal sphere settlement for about 10,000–20,000 people.
- Stanford torus: an alternative to Island One.
- Lewis One, a cylinder of radius 250 m with a non-rotating radiation shielding. The shielding protects the micro-gravity industrial space, too. The rotating part is 450m long and has several inner cylinders. Some of them are used for agriculture.
- Island Three or O'Neill cylinder, an even larger cylindrical design (3.2 or 4 km radius and 32 km long).
- McKendree cylinder, another concept that would use carbon nanotubes, a McKendree cylinder is paired cylinders in the same vein as the Island Three concept, but each 460 km in radius and 4600 km long (versus 3.2-4 km radius and 32 km long in the Island Three).
- Kalpana One, revised, a short cylinder with 250 m radius and 325 m length. The radiation shielding is 10 t/m^{2} and rotates. It has several inner cylinders for agriculture and recreation. It is sized for 3,000 residents.

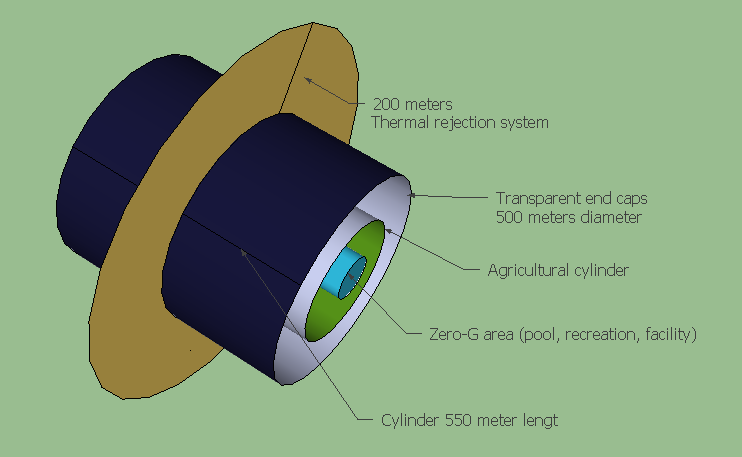
Kalpana One concept

- Bubbleworld or Inside/Outside concept, originated by Dandridge M. Cole in 1964, calls for drilling a tunnel through the longest axis of a large metallic asteroid and filling it with a volatile substance, possibly water. A very large solar reflector would be constructed nearby, focusing solar heat onto the asteroid, first to weld and seal the tunnel ends, then more diffusely to slowly heat the entire outer surface. As the metal softens, the water inside expands and inflates the mass, while rotational forces help shape it into a cylindrical form. Once expanded and allowed to cool, it can be spun to produce centrifugal pseudogravity, and the interior filled with soil, air and water. By creating a slight bulge in the middle of the cylinder, a ring-shaped lake can be made to form. Reflectors would allow sunlight to enter and to be directed where needed. This method would require a significant human and industrial presence in space to be at all feasible. The concept was popularized by science fiction author Larry Niven in his Known Space stories, describing such worlds as the primary habitats of the Belters, a civilization who had colonized the asteroid belt.
  - "Bubbleworld" is also the name of a different concept of space settlement thought of by Dani Eder in 1995 (it is alternatively known as an Ederworld). This is a relatively thin, spherical shell surrounding a mass of gas great enough to be held together by gravity. If hydrogen is used as the gas, the shell would have a radius of about 240,000 km. The outside of the shell would have a living space 2,400 km thick (filled with breathable air) with an additional outer shell (possibly made of 500 m of steel) above it to hold in the air.
- Asteroid terrarium, a similar idea to the bubble world, in the 2012 novel 2312 by hard science fiction writer Kim Stanley Robinson.
- Bishop Ring, a speculative design using carbon nanotubes: a torus 1000 km in radius, 500 km in width, and with atmosphere retention walls 200 km in height. The habitat would be large enough that it could be "roofless", open to outer space on the inner rim.

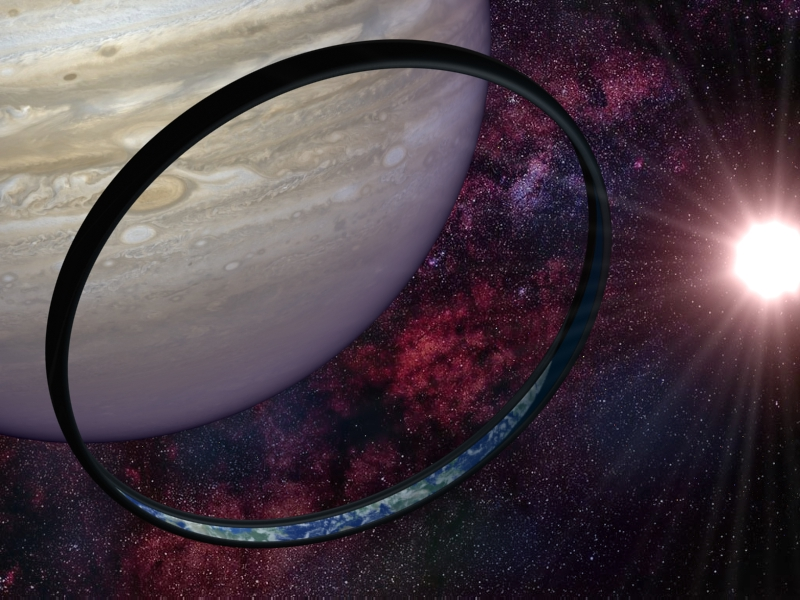
Artist's impression of a Bishop Ring

== Space station projects ==
Space settlements are in principle space stations, developments in space station construction therefore share many elements. The following projects and proposals, while not truly space settlements, incorporate aspects of what they would have and may represent stepping stones towards eventually building of space settlements.

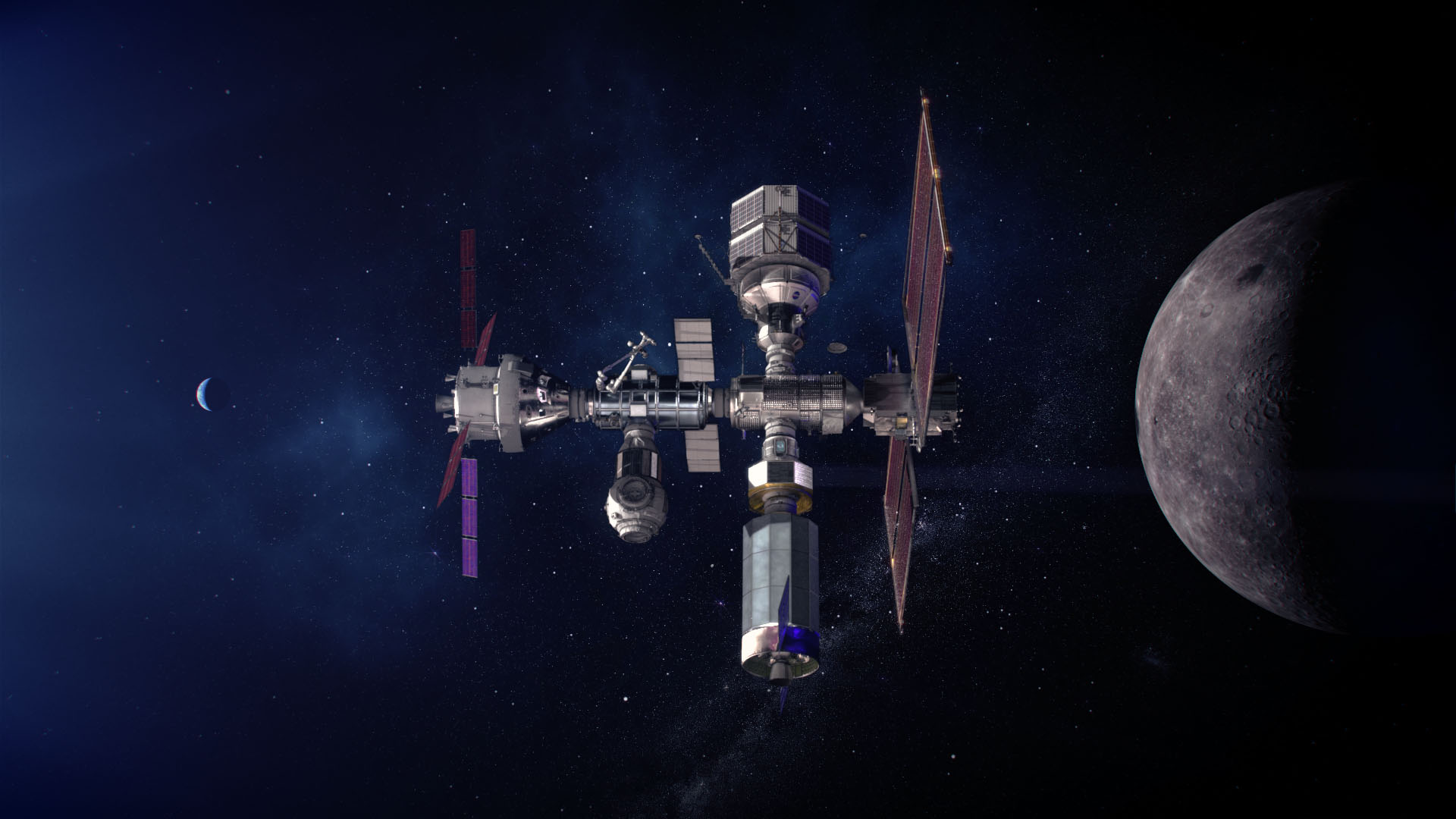
Concept art of the Lunar Gateway

The Lunar Gateway is a planned lunar space station, the first outside of Low Earth Orbit, therefore being the first spacecraft designed in unshielded space.

The ISS Centrifuge Demo was proposed in 2011 as a demonstration project for an artificial gravity compartment, preparatory for a similar module of a Nautilus-X Multi-Mission Space Exploration Vehicle (MMSEV). The ISS module would have an outside diameter of 30 feet (9.1 m) with a 30 inches (760 mm) ring interior cross-section diameter and would provide 0.08 to 0.51g partial gravity. This test and evaluation centrifuge would have the capability to become a Sleep Module for ISS crew. The subsequent vehicle design would be a long-duration crewed space transport vehicle including the artificial gravity compartment intended to promote crew-health for a crew of up to six persons on missions of up to two years duration. The partial-g torus-ring centrifuge would utilize both standard metal-frame and inflatable spacecraft structures and would provide 0.11 to 0.69g if built with the 40 feet (12 m) diameter option.

The Bigelow Commercial Space Station was announced in mid-2010. Bigelow has publicly shown space station design configurations with up to nine modules containing 100,000 cu ft (2,800 m^{3}) of habitable space. Bigelow began to publicly refer to the initial configuration as "Space Complex Alpha" in October 2010.

== In fiction ==
Space settlements have been elements of different science-fiction stories, across different media, from books to movies like Elysium (2013) for a wheel shaped Stanford torus type and Interstellar (2014) for a cylindrical O'Neill type.

== See also ==
- Arcology
- Bioastronautics
- Closed ecological system
- Domed city
- Dyson sphere
- Floating cities and islands in fiction
- Human outpost (artificially created controlled human habitat)
- Locomotion in space
- Megastructure
- Planetary chauvinism
- Research station – Facility for scientific research
- Space architecture
- Space observatory – Instrument in space to study astronomical objects
- Space stations and habitats in fiction
- Spaceflight
- Space station
- Spome
- Underground living
- Underground city
- Underwater habitat
