= Raymond Rodgers =

Raymond Rodgers may refer to:

- Raymond P. Rodgers (1849–1925), American naval officer
- Raymond Spencer Rodgers (1935–2007), British-born American educator and futurist

== See also ==
- Raymond Rogers (disambiguation)
