= Dandridge MacFarlan Cole =

American aerospace engineer

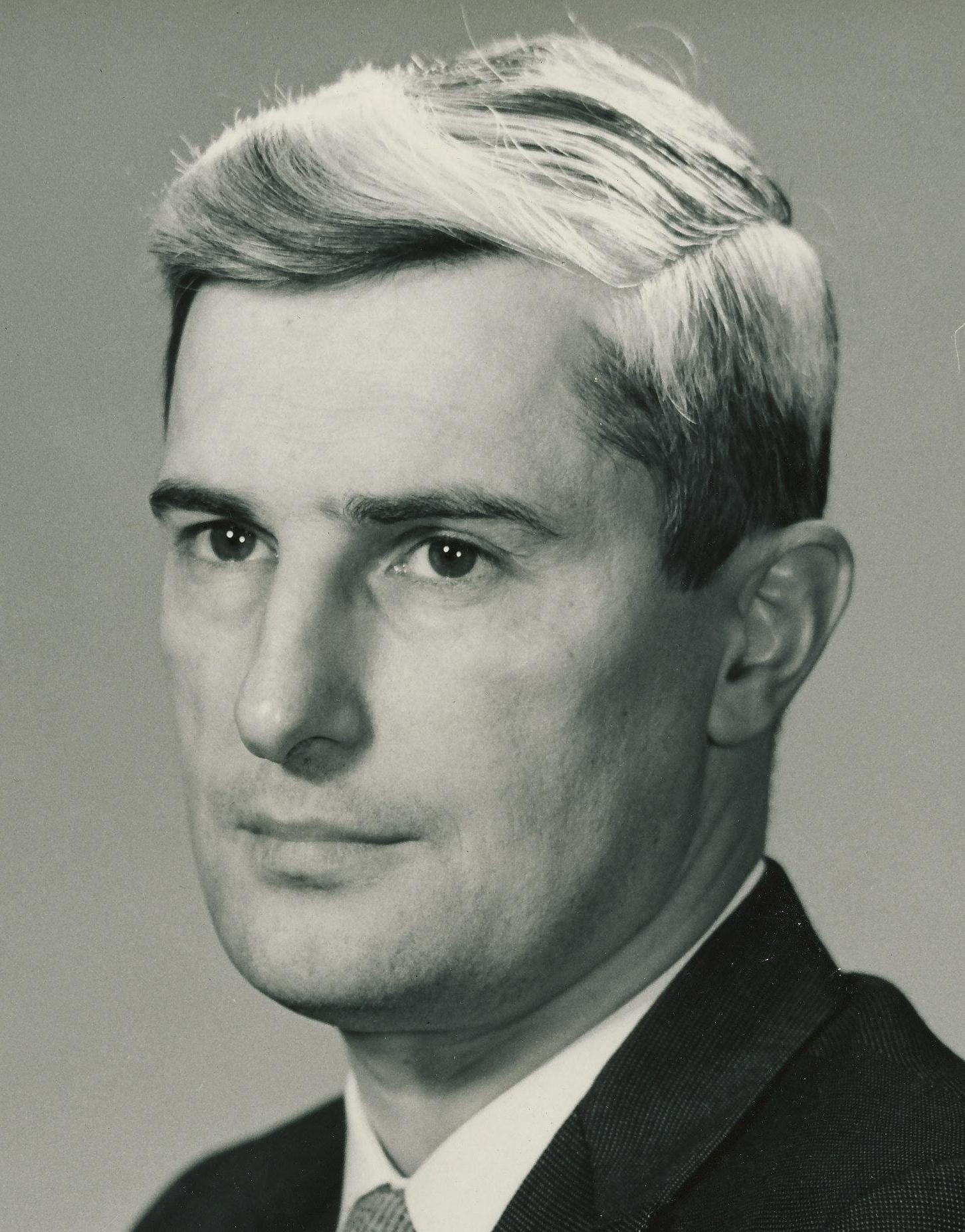
- Born: February 19, 1921; Sandusky, Ohio, US
- Died: October 29, 1965 (aged 44); King of Prussia, Pennsylvania, US
- Occupations: Aerospace engineer and designer
- Parent(s): Robert MacFarlan Cole III; Wertha Pendleton

Dandridge MacFarlan Cole (February 19, 1921 – October 29, 1965) was an American aerospace engineer, futurist, lecturer, and author.

Although he spent the early part of his career teaching and doing practical engineering work on airplanes and space vehicles, even from his time as a college student at Princeton, he was most interested in the future of space travel.

He gained national and even worldwide attention especially for his ideas about the mining, deflection, capture, and even colonization of asteroids. This led to his discussion of "Macrolife" as a possible next step in evolution.

== Biography ==
=== Parents, education, and military service ===
Cole was born February 19, 1921 in Sandusky, Ohio to Robert MacFarlan Cole III and Wertha Pendleton Cole, the daughter of bishop William Frederic Pendleton. In 1928 the family moved to Bryn Athyn, Pennsylvania, where his mother had been raised. He spent the balance of his childhood there, residing elsewhere only during his college and wartime years.

He attended the Academy of the New Church Secondary Schools from 1935 to 1939 and entered Princeton University in the fall of 1939. In his application to Princeton, he mentions, as one of the things attracting him to the University, what Henry Norris Russell, then director of the Princeton Observatory, had written about interplanetary travel. While at Princeton, he reported in a letter home, he did student work for Albert Einstein. In addition to his studies in mathematics and science, he also competed on the varsity gymnastics team and received a medal for his outstanding performances on the flying rings.

As a special wartime provision, he was allowed, after 3 years at Princeton, to satisfy the requirements for the bachelor's degree in chemistry by beginning medical school at Columbia University College of Physicians and Surgeons and successfully completing his first term. He therefore received his undergraduate degree at Princeton's midwinter commencement exercises in January 1943. His time at Columbia was short, however, and in March of that year he could no longer resist the call to serve in combat and he enlisted as a private in the army, joining the 139th Airborne Engineer Battalion of the 17th Airborne Division. He saw action during the Ardennes Counteroffensive in the "Battle of the Bulge" and was discharged from the army on April 30, 1945. During this time, Cole wrote his Songs and Poems of the Paratroops.

After the war, he returned to Princeton in 1946 under a program that allowed students who had left for the military to return and take additional courses. Cole took advantage of this to enroll in physics courses that would prepare him for graduate work at the University of Pennsylvania, from which he received a master's degree in Physics in 1949.

On June 17, 1949 he married Charlotte Ellen Davis, daughter of Edward and Margaretha(Lechner) Davis. They had six children.

=== Career ===
From 1949 to 1953, he taught physics and astronomy at Phillips Exeter Academy, in Exeter, New Hampshire. He contended that his astronomy course was probably the first astronautics course in any high school, as he used Willy Ley's The Conquest of Space as a textbook.

In 1953, he took a job in the aerospace industry with the Martin Company in Baltimore, at that point settling for aircraft design. But in 1956, he moved to the Martin facility in Denver and began to work in earnest for the space program, helping to design the Titan II, which launched the Gemini space capsules. 1960 brought a change in both company and position, as he became a consulting engineer in advance planning at the General Electric Missile and Space Division at Valley Forge, PA.

Cole died on October 29, 1965 at King of Prussia, Pennsylvania.

== Concepts ==
During the Second World War, he made some specific suggestions for a practical underwater breathing apparatus. This made the Office of Strategic Services nervous, as just such an invention was already a classified project. After some interviews, OSS concluded that he had not received unauthorized access to classified information, but told him to keep quiet about the idea.

As early as 1953, before the U.S. even had a space program, he predicted a crewed Moon landing by 1970.

Cole believed that government, industry, and education were neglecting systematic thought about the future and that it should become an academic discipline which would study the future in something of the same way that history uses its methods to study the past. With the pace of change accelerating, he argued, students should be trained in techniques for thinking about the future.

He was concerned about trends that were becoming evident in the 1950s and 1960s, especially the rapid increase in population (which he called "bio-detonation") and the proliferation of nuclear weapons. He saw the human race as being at a turning point, corresponding to the adolescence of an individual, in which humanity would either destroy itself or come to a collective state of maturity and relative stability.

=== Planetoids ===
Asteroids, or "planetoids" as Cole argued they should more properly be called, were a particular focus of his work. In the early 1960s, he surveyed what was then known about what he termed "Cis-Martian" asteroids. (These are now referred to as "near-Earth asteroids," or NEAs," a subclass of near-Earth objects" - NEOs.)

At the 1962 annual meeting of the American Astronautical Society, Cole warned that, as early as 1970, the Soviets could develop the technology to divert a near Earth asteroid to impact a target on Earth. The title of his paper was prosaic: A Possible Military Application of a Cis-Martian Asteroid, but the wire services got hold of the story and the result was lurid headlines in many papers across the country.

On the more positive side, Cole was an early proponent of asteroid mining, suggesting that they could yield trillions of dollars' worth of resources. While one approach to the retrieval of this mineral wealth would be to send expeditions to the asteroid belt, Cole also laid out plans for asteroid capture, whereby near Earth asteroids could be brought into orbit around the Earth.

He was known especially for promoting colonization of the asteroids. Once captured, asteroids could be hollowed out, or actually inflated to create a bubbleworld with habitable space on the inside. The resulting space arks could orbit within the Solar System, or be sent out on interstellar expeditions.

=== Macrolife ===
Especially in connection with the idea of planetoid colonies, he coined the term "Macrolife," as early as a talk for the annual meeting of The Institute of Navigation, 23 June 1960. In the published version of the paper, he notes the similarity of his idea to the "multi organismic life form" of Isaac Asimov just then published in the July 1960 issue of Analog-Science Fact and Fiction. He explains the concept as follows: "Macrolife can be defined as 'life squared per cell' or more particularly as ' multicellular life squared per cell'. Taking man as representative of multicellular life we can say that man is the mean proportional between Macro life and the cell, or Macro life is to man as man is to cell."

Cole conceived Macrolife as a possible next step in evolution, potentially as momentous as the transition from single-celled to multicelled life. Units of Macrolife, self-contained human societies in planetoid colonies or elsewhere, would have the capacity for growth, motion, reproduction, self-repair, and response to external stimuli. He developed further details in his 1961 The Ultimate Human Society and in subsequent books.

== Cultural references ==
Books

- Macrolife, a 1979 novel by George Zebrowski, explicitly takes it title and credits its inspiration from Cole's theory.
- Sunspacer, a 1984 novel by George Zebrowski, opens with the protagonist beginning college at Dandridge Cole University, in a space colony at Lagrangian point 5.
- The Romulan Prize, a 1993 Star Trek: The Next Generation novel, devotes a page to having the character Data outline Cole's conception of a planetoid colony.
- The Hollow Moon series (2012 - 2024) by Steph Bennion begins in the colony ship "Dandridge Cole," an inside-out world within an asteroid, the eponymous "Hollow Moon," of the book title.

== Bibliography ==
=== By Cole ===
==== Books ====
- Songs and Poems of the Paratroops, Blaetz Brothers, Philadelphia: 1944
- Exploring the Secrets of Space, (1963 with I. M. Levitt)
- Islands in Space: The Challenge of the Planetoids, (1964 with Donald W. Cox)
- Beyond Tomorrow, (1965 illustrated with space art originated by Roy G. Scarfo)

==== Monographs ====
- Minimum Time Interplanetary Orbits, The American Astronautical Society: December 1957.
- Around the Moon in 80 Hours, (with Donald E. Muir) Advances in Astronautical Sciences, Vol. 3, pp. 27–1 to 27-30; Proceedings of the Western Regional Meeting of the American Astronautical Society, August 19, 1958.
- Lunar Colonization, American Rocket Society: March 19, 1959.
- Feasibility of Propelling Vehicles by Contained Nuclear Explosions, American Astronautical Society: January 18–21, 1960.
- Space Vehicle Evolution, The Martin Company: February 1960.
- Extraterrestrial Colonies, The Martin Company: June 1960.
- Social and Political Implications of the Ultimate Human Society, The American Astronautical Society: January 18, 1961.
- The Space Booster Gap and the Panama Theory of Space Flight, General Electric Missile and Space Department: February 22, 1961.
- Report on the Panama Theory, The American Astronautical Society: August 1–3, 1961.
- Today is Tomorrow: Long Range Planning for the Space Age, Temple University: August 25, 1961.
- A Scientific Survey of the Cis Martian Asteroid Group, (with George M. Kohler) General Electric Missile and Space Department: October 27, 1961.
- A Possible Military Application of a Cis-Martian Asteroid, The American Astronautical Society: January 16–18, 1962.
- Strategic Areas in Space,: The Panama Theory, Institute of the Aerospace Sciences: March 15, 1962.
- Exploration of the Close-Approach Asteroids, General Electric Missile and Space Department: April 16, 1962.
- Some Scientific and Economic Aspects of Asteroid Capture, Institute of the Aerospace Sciences: July 19, 1962.
- The Next Fifty Years in Space: Man and Maturity, General Electric Missile and Space Department: 1963.
- Astronautics Applications of the Asteroids, The American Astronautical Society: January 17, 1963.
- Extraterrestrial Resources Development and Propellant Production, (with Rodney W. Johnson and Duane L. Barney,) General Electric Missile and Space Department: November 13, 1963.
- Military Use of Space 1965 - 1975, prepared for University of Pennsylvania Foreign Policy Research Institute: June 1, 1964.
- The Next Forty Years of Exploration, The Explorers Club: September 23, 1964
- Some Uses for Planetoid Resources, General Electric Missile and Space Department: November 19, 1964.
- Beyond Apollo: Manned Interplanetary Flight in the Seventies, American Institute of Aeronautics and Astronautics: February 11, 1965.
- Applications of Planetary Resources, (prepared as a presentation for the Institute of Electrical and Electronics Engineers 1965 International Space Symposium, November 2–4, 1965, but not delivered)

==== Articles ====
- "Interpretation of Malina-Summerfield Criterion for Optimization of Multistage Rockets"(with L. Ivan Epstein,) Jet Propulsion, March, 1956, p. 188.
- "The Earth-Mars Constant thrust Brachistochrone," Jet Propulsion, February 1957, p. 176.
- "Times Required for Continuous Thrust Earth-Moon Trips," Jet Propulsion, April 1957, p. 416.
- "Optimization of Rockets for Maximum Payload Energy"(with Michael A. Marrese,) ARS Journal, January 1959, p. 71.
- "Commercially Feasible Spaceflight," Astronautics, September 1959, pp. 88–89.
- "Around the Moon in 80 Hours"(with Robert Granville,) Space World, Vol. 1, No. 2, July 1960, pp. 28–31, 54.
- "Extraterrestrial Colonies," Navigation, No. 7, Summer-Autumn 1960, pp. 83–98.
- “The Feasibility of Propelling Vehicles by Contained Nuclear Explosions,” Advances In the Astronautical Sciences, Vol. 6, pp. 726-742, 1961.
- "Macro-Life," Space World, Vol. 1. Nos. 10 & 11, September & October 1961, 44-46.
- "Reds May Be Using Saturn-Class Boosters," Missiles and Rockets, October 9, 1961.
- "Asteroids Stir Growing Interest," Missiles and Rockets, February 25, 1963.
- "Capturing the Asteroid," Astronautics and Aerospace Engineering, March 1963, pp. 88–93.
- "$50,000,000,000,000 from the Asteroids," Space World, Vol. 4, No. 2, February, March 1963, pp. 1–8.
- "The Asteroids," Discovery: The Magazine of Scientific Progress, Vol. XXIV, No. 11, November 1963, pp. 24–28.
- "Where is Science Taking Us?" The Saturday Review, February 1, 1964, pp. 54–55.
- "Rocket Propellants from the Moon"(with R. Segal,) Astronautics and Aeronautics, October 1964.
- "Manned Interplanetary Flights in the Seventies with Saturn-Apollo Technology," Annals of the New York Academy of Sciences Vol. 140 December 16, 1966, pp. 451–466.

=== About Cole ===
- "Outward Bound," Time, January 27, 1961.
- "Living in Space," The Philadelphia Inquirer, April 30, 1961.
- Alexander, Tom. "The Wild Birds Find a Corporate Roost," Fortune, August 1964, p. 130
- Benford, Gregory and Zebroski, George. Skylife: Space Habitats in Story and Science, Harcourt: 2000.
- Cole, Martha Aubrey, Searching for a Man of Iron, Fountain Publishing: 2012.
- Cox, Donald W. and Chestek, James H. Doomsday Asteroid, Prometheus Book: 1996.
- David, Leonard. "Asteroid Bombs," Omni, March 1980, p. 46.
- David, Leonard. "100 Stars of Space," Ad Astra, Vol. 3, No. 6, July–August 1991, p. 60.
- Frisch, Bruce H. "Dandridge Cole: G. E.'s Way-Out Man," Science Digest, Vol. 58, No. 1, July 1965, pp. 9–15.
- Raithel, W. "A Tribute to Dandridge McFarland Cole 1921-1965," in Annals of the New York Academy of Sciences Vol. 140 December 16, 1966, pp. 6–9.
- Rosenberg, George J. "Space City Preview: The Moon is Blueprinted!" New York Mirror Magazine, December 31, 1961, pp. 8–9.
- Wolper, David. "The Way Out Men," ABC documentary, aired February 13, 1965.

== See also ==
- Spome
- Macrolife
- Asteroid impact avoidance
