= An Optimist's Tour of the Future =

- Author: Mark Stevenson
- Language: English
- Publisher: Avery Publishing
- Publication date: 2011
- Pages: 373
- ISBN: 9781583334140
- OCLC: 940649511

An Optimist's Tour of the Future: One Curious Man Sets Out to Answer "What's Next?' is a 2011 non-fiction book written by London-based British author, comedian and businessman Mark Stevenson. The book was released in January of that year in the United Kingdom and in February in the United States.

== Overview ==
According to the author, the impetus for writing this survey of cutting-edge medical, scientific, computing, robotics and environmental trends, was a sudden appreciation of his own mortality and a subsequent desire to learn more about the kind of world in which the rest of his life would be played out. The resulting 'tour of the future' unfolds in the form of a travelogue that takes the writer around the world to meet thought leaders and professionals working at what might be described as 'the scientific horizon'. Drawing on his background as a comedian, the author adopts a tone and style that are breezy and the text is dotted with one-liners and wry observations.

== Critical review ==
The book received largely positive reviews in the UK, US and Australian press, in the blogosphere and on bookseller sites. Most often praised were the book's breadth (Wired's Geek Dad called it "a very coherent and entertaining journey through the world of future technology"), balance (The Guardian described the book as "a measured effort to take stock of the reasons for hope, and to keep faith with the enlightenment project"), approachable style (Brainpickings.org wondered if the book might be "our generation's version of Bill Bryson's iconic A Short History of Nearly Everything") and the author's ability to take often complex scientific research and render it understandable to the non-science literate ("an ability to express even the most complex scientific problems in terms easily understood by a layperson" said The Sydney Morning Herald).

On the negative side, some reviewers found the author's humour unsuitable and distracting. Stuart Kelly of the Scotsman took issue with what he saw as Stevenson's "inappropriate, wise-cracking levity throughout" and Marek Kohn's review in the Financial Times suggested "trivialities get in the way of the important details gathered on his tour".

== Translated editions ==
As of November 2015, there were nine translated editions available: Dutch, German, Spanish, Turkish, Estonian, Hungarian, Lithuanian, Korean and Polish.
