= John Michael Godier =

American author and science communicator

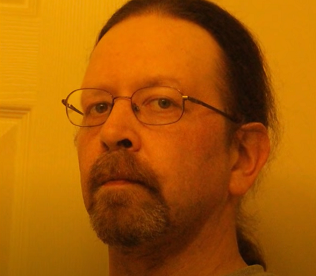
- Godier in 2017
- Born: Mid 1970s
- Occupations: Author, science communicator futurist
- Known for: Event Horizon (podcast)
- Website: JohnMichaelGodier

John Michael Godier (b. mid 1970s) is an American science fiction author, science communicator and futurist who produces documentary videos centered on future technology and the potential for advanced extraterrestrial life. As of October 2026, he has 494,000 subscribers on his personal YouTube channel and 334,000 subscribers on his interview channel Event Horizon.

Event Horizon publishes interviews with some of the most well-known scientists in the world, including Nobel-winning physicist Frank Wilczek, NASA Chief Scientist James Green and the Harvard Professor Avi Loeb.

== Bibliography ==
- Supermind. Chalin and Harris, 2017. ISBN 978-0-9894-6542-7
- Rescue at Io (The Salvagers) . Chalin and Harris Books, 2013
- The Salvagers. Chalin and Harris Books, 2013. ISBN 978-0-9894-6540-3

== See also ==
- Isaac Arthur – American science communicator
