= Ray Rogers =

Ray Rogers may refer to:

- Ray Rogers (archer), American archer
- Ray Rogers (labor activist) (born 1944), American labor rights activist
- Ray Rogers (politician) (1931–2020), American politician
- Raymond Rogers (1927–2005), American chemist
- Raymond R. Rogers, professor of geology

== See also ==
- Raymond Rodgers (disambiguation)
