= Macrolife =

1979 novel by George Zebrowski

Macrolife: A Mobile Utopia
- First-edition cover
- Author: George Zebrowski
- Cover artist: Rick Sternbach
- Language: English
- Series: Macrolife
- Genre: Future history, Science fiction novel
- Publisher: Harper & Row
- Publication date: May 1979
- Publication place: United States
- Media type: Print (hardback & paperback)
- Pages: 284
- ISBN: 0-06-014792-X (First edition, hardback)
- OCLC: 4500272
- Dewey Decimal: 813/.5/4
- LC Class: PZ4.Z4 Mac 1979 PS3576.E35
- Followed by: Cave of Stars (1999)

Macrolife: A Mobile Utopia is a 1979 science fiction novel by American author George Zebrowski.

== Plot introduction ==
By 2021, Earth's nations are at (relative) peace, and even the erstwhile poorer nations are beginning to enjoy stable political and economic regimes. The invention of a super-strong material named Bulerite is partially responsible for this, which enables Earth to, at last, initiate a burgeoning space industry. However, events unfold which result in the first "Macrolife" colony leaving the Solar System for the nearer stars.

== Explanation of the novel's title ==
Scientist Dandridge M. Cole originated the term "Macro Life" in his 1961 book The Ultimate Human Society, though the idea of using asteroids as mobile "societal containers" is a common theme in science, and science fiction.

Cole defined Macro Life as "life squared per cell", i.e. "Macro Life is to man what man is to the cell". Zebrowski, in the novel, regards Macrolife as an open-ended, expansive union of organic, cybernetic and machine intelligences (human and alien) with spacefaring as its means of dissemination.

== Plot summary ==
The novel is split into three main sections.

(I) Sunspace: 2021 ... The Bulero family/corporation, inventors and marketers of Bulerite which is used to build the huge cities which house the Earth's (and colonies) teeming millions, are at the pinnacle of their influence and wealth. Unfortunately, it is discovered - too late - that the substance is inherently flawed, in that after a time it destabilizes and self-destructs with spectacular results. Gradually, all the Bulerite on Earth, and that on and in the space colonies throughout the solar system becomes unstable, causing destruction and megadeath.

The devastation precipitates a war with Earth's colonies on the outer planets, with whom a struggle for control of the solar system existed. Many nuclear-tipped missiles explode on Earth which adds to the Bulerite destabilization. The combination of the Bulerite and the nuclear explosions cause a mysterious shroud of radiation to envelop the Earth. All humans on the planet are assumed dead.

Before this final devastation, many refugees manage to escape to the Moon, Mars, and Asterome, an orbiting colony situated inside a hollowed-out asteroid at the Moon's L5 point. Included amongst the refugees are most of Bulero family who end up on Asterome.

The leadership of Asterome are now faced with several severe challenges: Handling the influx of refugees, removing any Bulerite used in the construction of Asterome, consolidating their resources now that the Earth can no longer supply them with finished goods, and preventing increasingly aggressive attempts by the outer colonies and remnants of Earth's government to take control and plunder Asterome.

When a means of providing Asterome with propulsion is discovered, the leadership of Asterome decide that leaving the solar system is the best option available to ensure Asterome's short-term survival as well as proving a way for Mankind to survive should the solar system be destroyed by the after-effects of Bulerite and war.

After overcoming attempts to stop them, Asterome finally manages to leave the solar system, heading for Alpha Centauri, the nearest star.

(II) Macrolife: 3000 ... A thousand years later, Asterome has grown by adding concentric layers of shells around itself, and is now host to millions of humans and Humanity II cybernetic organisms.

The invention of engines that can surpass the speed of light has made it possible for the colony to explore far and wide; the second part finds them studying a planet orbiting the star Praesepe over 500 light years away. John Bulero, a young clone of one of the original Bulero's, decides to see what life is like on a planet, and lives for a while amongst the natives, descendants of a human colony that has reverted to savagery. His experiences, while tragic, enable him to grow as an individual.

Eventually, Asterome travels back to the solar system to see how events there have unfolded. Their arrival coincides with the first time humans meet an intelligent alien species which is itself experimenting with Macrolife, and, together, the species begin a process of intermingling and further expansion into the universe.

(III) The Dream of Time ... A hundred billion years have passed, and Macrolife is now the dominant culture throughout the universe, which is, at this stage, beginning to contract into its final death throes. Most life is in the form of a Hyperpersonal Aggregate; an amalgam of individuals of all kinds. The aggregate re-individualizes John Bulero again, to help them solve the problem of how Macrolife can survive beyond the death of the Universe. Eventually, they discover many Macrolife survivors from many previous cycles of the universe, who help them to conquer time itself.

== Characters in "Macrolife" ==
- Richard Bulero : Central character.
- Jack Bulero : Richard's father, head of Bulero Enterprises.
- Janet Bulero : Richard's mother.
- Samuel Bulero : Richard's uncle
- Orton Blackfriar : lawyer; Governor of New Mexico.
- Margot Toren : Richard's girlfriend, later wife.
- John Bulero : Clone of Samuel Bulero.
- Rob Wheeler : John Bulero's exemplar.
- Anulka : John Bulero's wife on the planet Lea.
- Tomas Blakfar : Lean descendant of the Blackfriar family.

== Follow ups ==
Several other books have been written to take place in the same fictional world:

- Transfigured Night and Wayside World, two novelettes published in 1978, are "set in the planned Macrolife mosaic of short stories, novelettes, novellas, and novels". Wayside World (part of a shared-universe project generated by Poul Anderson) was also the name of a chapter in the novel.
- In the Distance, and Ahead in Time a Macrolife novelette, was published in Amazing Stories in 1993. It was also the title of his 10-story short-story collection of 2002 (ISBN 0-7862-4687-1).
- In 1999, Zebrowski wrote Cave of Stars, set in the same universe as Macrolife (though not a sequel).

== Release details ==
- 1979, USA, Harper & Row (ISBN 0-06-014792-X), Pub date ? ? 1979, hardback (First edition)
- 1980, UK, Orbit / Futura Pubns (ISBN 0-7088-8060-6), Pub date ? May 1980, paperback
- 1981, USA, Avon (ISBN 0-380-55483-6), Pub date ? ? 1981, paperback
- 1990, USA, Easton Press (ISBN ?), Pub date ? ? 1990, hardback
- 2006, USA, Pyr (ISBN 1-59102-340-8), Pub date 2 January 2006, hardback
- 2006, USA, Pyr (ISBN 1-59102-341-6), Pub date 2 January 2006, paperback

== See also ==
- Spome
