= Renzo Provinciali =

Italian anarchist (1895–1981)

Renzo Provinciali (born Parma, Italy, 14 March 1895; died Rome, 2 October 1981), a lawyer by profession, was a notable Italian anarchist, Futurist and journalist. He is perhaps best known for his opposition to Marinetti’s Futurist Manifesto.

In the years before the First World War he was at the heart of a group of anarchists and Futurists in Parma, a center for revolutionary movements. From 1912–1913 he published the anarcho-futurist journal La Barricata (The Barricade) (for which Carlo Carrà designed the masthead). His manifesto Futurism and Anarchy, published in The Barricade, attacked Marinetti on the basis that his attempt to produce an avant-garde aesthetic was undermined by his failure to renounce bourgeois politics: ‘How is it possible to imagine a bourgeois art in an anarchist society, or a futurist art in a bourgeois society?’

== Bibliography ==
- Renzo Provinciali: Nota bio-bibliografica (in Italian)
