= Paul M. Sutter =

American astrophysicist

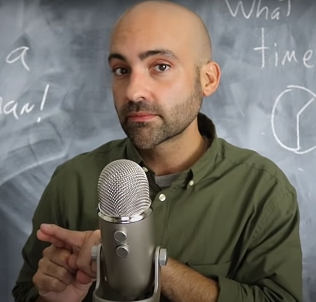
- Education: California Polytechnic State University (BS); University of Illinois at Urbana–Champaign (PhD)
- Scientific career
- Fields: astrophysics; physical cosmology; science communication
- Workplaces: Paris Institute of Astrophysics; Center for Cosmology and Astro-Particle Physics
- Website: www.pmsutter.com

Paul M. Sutter is an astrophysicist, science educator and science communicator.

== Early life ==
Sutter received his Bachelor of Science in physics from California Polytechnic State University in 2005 and received his PhD in physics from the University of Illinois at Urbana–Champaign in 2011.

His father was a Catholic priest, but Sutter does not speak on his personal views of religion, other than to say that he knows atheists and people of all religious faiths who have reconciled their beliefs with science.

== Career ==
Sutter is a cosmologist and community outreach coordinator with the Department of Astronomy at Ohio State University and the chief scientist at the Center of Science and Industry in Columbus, Ohio.

He hosts several podcasts and a YouTube series, consults for television and film productions, publishes in popular science publications, and gives public lectures on topics in physics and astronomy topics.

In 2017, Sutter received the award for "Best Director" at the Escape Velocity Film Festival for his film Song of the Stars.
