= Anders Sörman-Nilsson =

Swedish-Australian futurist and author

Anders Sörman-Nilsson (born 1981) is a Swedish-Australian futurist and author known for his work on global trends, innovation, digital transformation and sustainability. He is the founder and chief executive of the strategic foresight and advisory firm Thinque.

== Early life and education ==
Sörman-Nilsson was born in Sweden and later moved to Australia, where he pursued higher education, earning a Bachelor of Laws from the Australian National University and a Global Executive MBA from the University of Sydney.

== Career and views ==
Sörman-Nilsson's book Digilogue (2013) was one of the earlier books to explicitly advise on the combination of emotional and strategic balance and not to abandon analogue traditions that create meaning even in the digital world. Furthermore, his book Seamless (2017) illustrates the ways digital companies transform the way we live, and the creative methods used to combine technology with analogue channels.

In January 2025 he outlined key forces shaping the world in 2025 and warned that Australia risked falling behind if it failed to adapt to rapid advances in artificial intelligence, stating that “we’ll have 100 years worth of exploration, discovery, advancement in the next 10 years courtesy of AI.” He has also forecast that the rules of real estate are being rewritten by climate change and shifting demographics.

As a speaker, Sörman-Nilsson has delivered two TEDx talks.

== Books ==
Sörman-Nilsson is the author of the following books on futurism and business strategy:

- Sörman-Nilsson, Anders (2010). Thinque: Funky Upgrade Your Thinking. Thinque. ISBN 9780646510248.
- Sörman-Nilsson, Anders (2013). Digilogue: How to Win the Digital Minds and Analogue Hearts of Tomorrow's Customer. John Wiley & Sons Australia. ISBN 9781118641385.
- Sörman-Nilsson, Anders (2017). Seamless: A Hero's Journey of Digital Disruption, Adaptation and Human Transformation. Wiley. ISBN 9780730332855.
