= Spome =

Hypothetical matter-closed, energy-open life support system

A spome is any hypothetical system closed with respect to matter and open with respect to energy capable of sustaining human life indefinitely. The term was coined in 1966 by Isaac Asimov in a paper entitled "There’s No Place Like Spome", published in Atmosphere in Space Cabins and Closed Environments and originally presented as a paper to the American Chemical Society on September 13, 1965. Asimov himself declared his coined word to be uneuphonious (not pleasant to the ear), and defined it as being a portmanteau of the two words "space home".

== Definition ==
Asimov described how energy flows through a life-support system from a low entropic state from which it moves all material resources, such as air, water, and food with the rejection of low-grade heat as the final energy output. The concept reflects the dynamics of ecosystem ecology as described by Howard T. Odum.

The term applies to any life-support system from submarines to spaceships, and includes the operation of the Earth's own biosphere.

The word "spome" was also referenced in a reprint of Asimov's original article in Is Anyone There? 1967 by Doubleday, Ash. He surmised that an asteroid could be "spomified" by being hollowed out and equipped suitably for long term, sustainable flight.

=== Buckminster Fuller ===
Buckminster Fuller called the concept of a spome "an astronaut's black box", meaning that the necessities of life were supplied through the absorption of energy to cycle material resources and eject heat from the system. Fuller's institute is furthering this concept through understanding of the Earth's comprehensive life support system.

=== Gerard O'Neill ===
Gerard K. O'Neill does not acknowledge the term "spome", but writes about the concept in The High Frontier: Human Colonies in Space. Asimov's concept predates and exceeds O’Neill’s by using a propulsion system with a Spome to allow development of the Solar System, and then leaving to populate the galaxy over eons.

=== Dandridge Cole ===
Engineer Dandridge Cole in the 1960s called these settlements, "Macro-Life".

== See also ==
- Autonomous building – Building designed to be independent from public infrastructure
- Arcology – Type of design principles for human habitats
- Biosphere 2 – Closed ecological research center in Arizona
- Closed ecological system – Ecosystem that does not exchange matter with the exterior
- Human ecology – Study of the relationship between humans and their natural, social, and built environments
- Living systems – Multiple interactions and regulation of life forms with their environment
- Macrolife – 1979 novel by George Zebrowski
- Primary life support system – Life support device for a space suit
