= Mark Stevenson (businessman) =

British entrepreneur

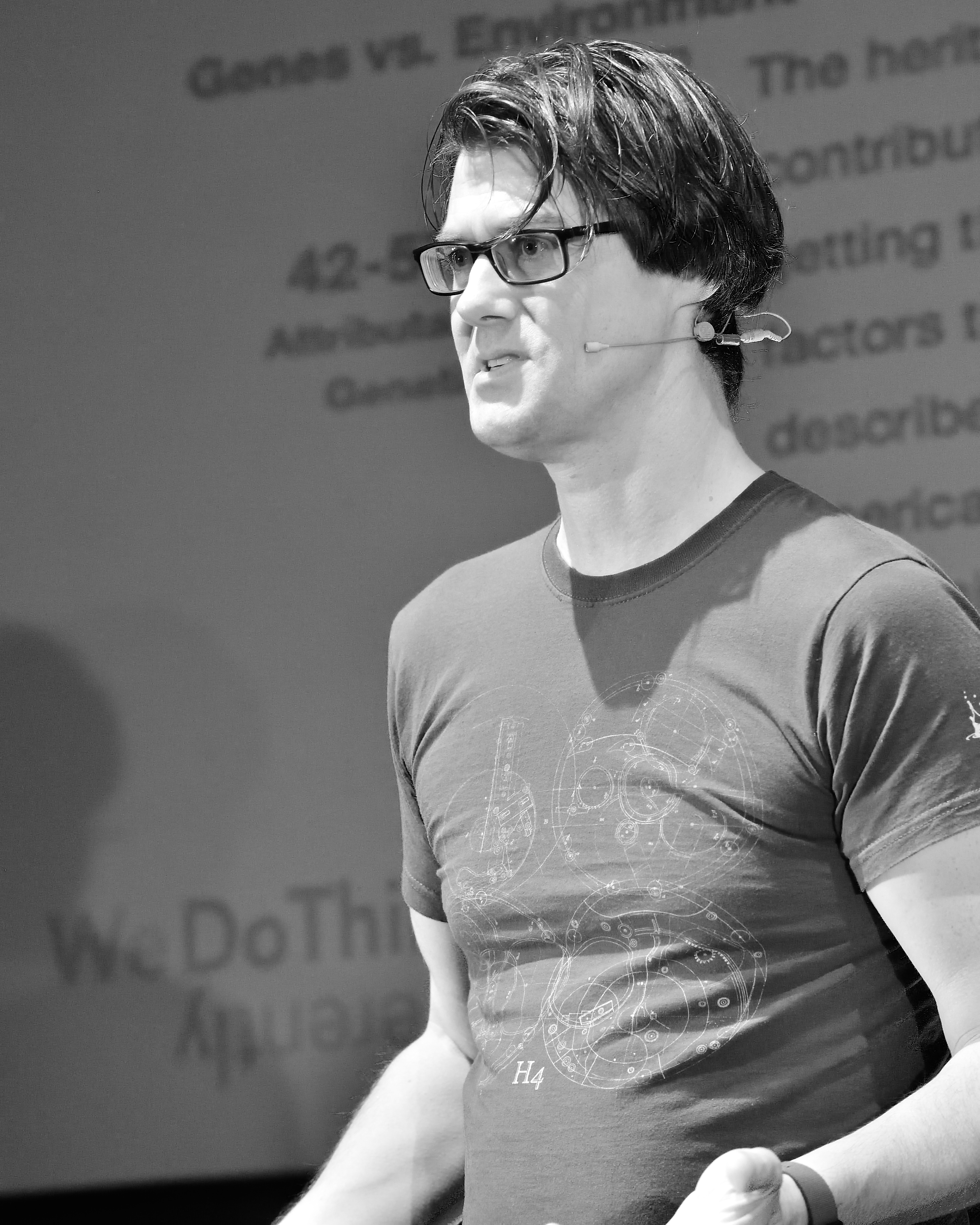
Stevenson's lecture "The Future and What to do About It" at QED 2016.

Mark Stevenson (born 1971) is a London-based British writer, businessman, public speaker and 'reluctant' futurologist, as well as a semi-professional musician and former comedian. Stevenson's first book, An Optimist's Tour of the Future, was released in the United Kingdom in January 2011 (February 2011 in the United States). His second, We Do Things Differently, followed on 5 January 2017.

== Education ==
Stevenson graduated from the University of Salford in 1992 with a first-class honors degree in Information Technology.

== Early career ==
Stevenson began his career working for Ovum, an information technology think tank. There, he co-authored reports on e-commerce and smart card technology and edited material related to CASE (computer-aided software engineering).

After leaving Ovum, Stevenson worked as a freelancer, consulting primarily in the field of cryptography.

Throughout this period, Stevenson was also a semi-professional musician. As a founding member of the band Clear, he co-wrote both music and lyrics, sang and played bass. The band's sole album, Coming Around, had the unique distinction of being funded by a company founded by the members but owned in part by the band's fans. The album, recorded in 2003, was produced by Andy Metcalfe at the studios of Glenn Tilbrook; it was mastered at Abbey Road.

== Comedy ==
After leaving Clear, Stevenson took to comedy. His stand-up material was primarily focused on science. He has appeared at many comedy clubs, festivals and other venues. And although his current duties as businessman and author preclude a full-time career in comedy, he still occasionally makes appearances at clubs and on programs. He continues to write comedy. His farce, co-authored with Jack Milner, Octopus Soup! toured the UK in 2019.

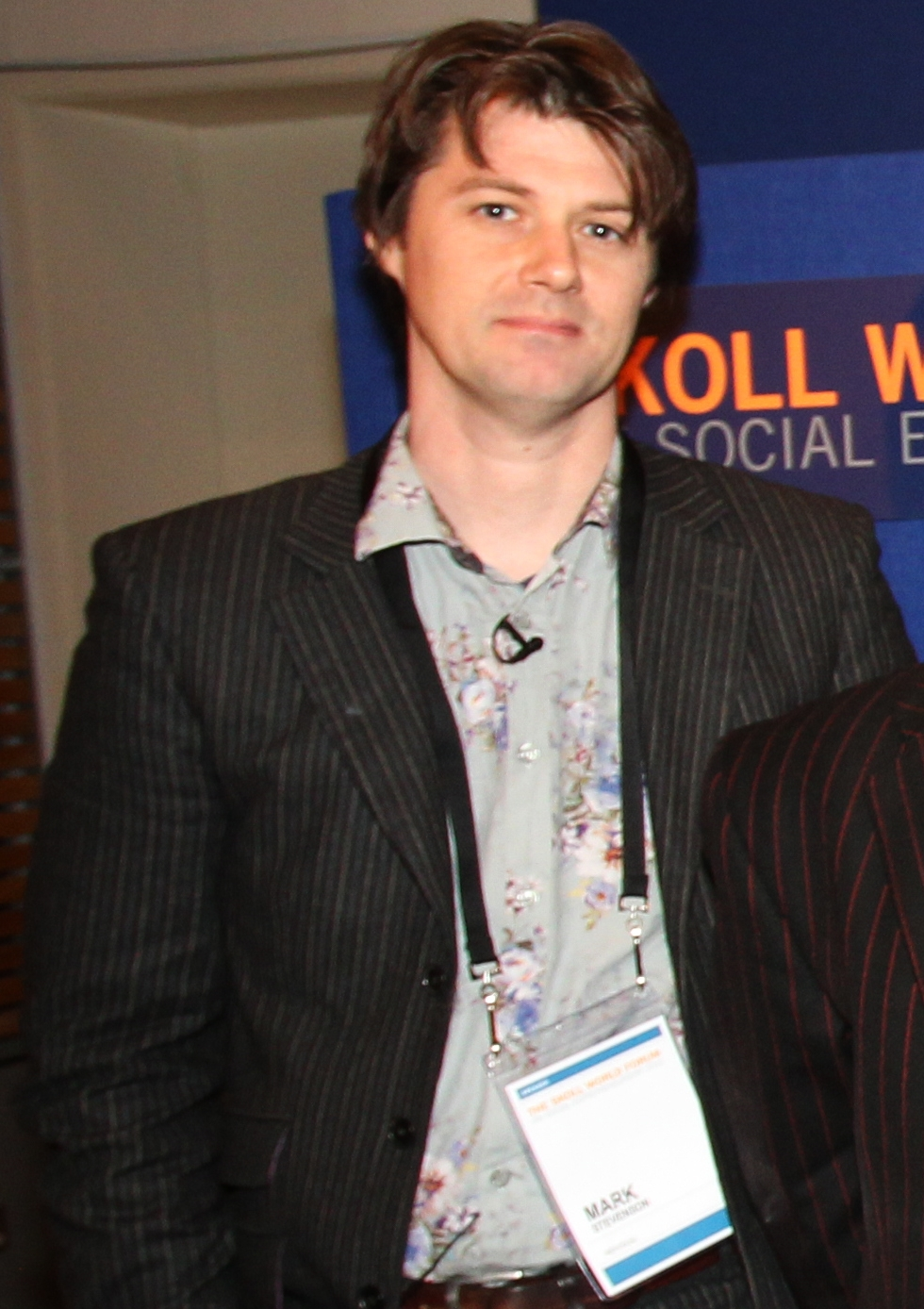
Mark Stevenson at the 2011 Skoll World Forum.

== Writing ==
In early 2011, Stevenson released a book entitled An Optimist's Tour of the Future (published by Profile Books in January 2011 in the UK and by Avery in February 2011 in the United States), which explores how invention and innovation can help overcome several of humanity's current problems. The book has since been translated into 12 languages.

Notably, whilst writing An Optimist's Tour of the Future, Stevenson met the then President of the Maldives, Mohamed Nasheed and was present at the world's first underwater cabinet meeting. "to draw attention to the climate change issue... he [Mohamed Nasheed] held an underwater cabinet meeting... I was there, I was lucky, I was one of four people that wasn't in the government or the support team that was in the water at this time, it was a very bizarre experience..."

His second book, We Do Things Differently (also with Profile Books) is described as "an enthralling picture of what can be done to address the world's most pressing dilemmas, a journey that offers a much needed dose of down-to-earth optimism. It is a window on (and a roadmap to) a different and better future"

== Current Activities ==
Following the success of his book, Stevenson is in high demand as a consultant and speaker on issues related to cultural change and technology trends - subjects he discusses on his podcast with comedian Jon Richardson and fellow futurist Ed Gillespie. He still maintains a musical persona as one half of progressive rock duo Quantum Pig.

He fulfils a number of advisory roles notably to The UK Ministry of Defence (climate and national security), Médecins Sans Frontières and Client Earth.
