= Ross Dawson =

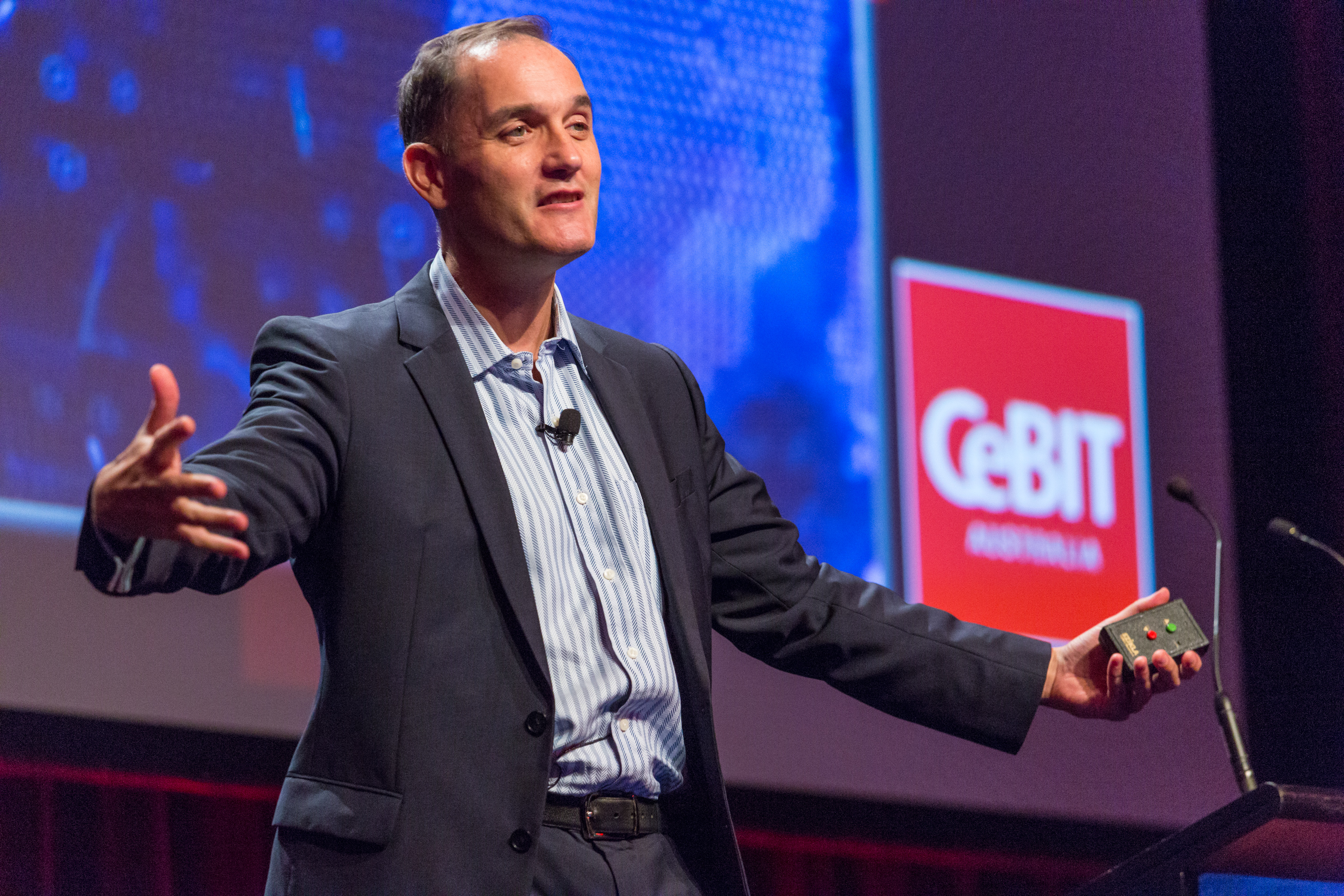
Ross Dawson, 2016

Ross Dawson is an Australian author, futurist, entrepreneur and former stockbroker. Best known for his 2002 book 'Living Networks', Dawson founded the futures think tank Future Exploration Network and consults on digital futures to various big organisations such as Ernst & Young, Macquarie Bank, Microsoft and News Corp.

Named by Digital Media magazine as one of the 40 biggest players in Australia's digital age, Dawson graduated from Bristol University with a BSc (Hons) and from Macquarie University with a GradDip in applied finance.

Dawson regularly gives keynote addresses on digital media futures and his 'Future of Media Reports' have a readership in the tens of thousands.

According to Richard Susskind writing in The Times, Dawson's first book, Developing Knowledge-Based Client Relationships, was a bestseller, resulting in a second edition in 2005.

The New York Times credits Dawson with predicting the growth of social media in 2002 in his book Living Networks. The BBC credits him with being a "leading futurist" and with having "predicted the social networking revolution" in 2002.

== Books ==
- Developing Knowledge-Based Client Relationships 2000 Woburn, MA:Butterworth-Heinemann ISBN 0-7506-7185-8
- Living Networks 2003, New Jersey:Prentice Hall ISBN 0-13-035333-7
- Implementing Enterprise 2.0: A Practical Guide To Creating Business Value Inside Organizations With Web Technologies 2009, Sydney:Advanced Human Technologies
- Getting Results from Crowds: The definitive guide to using crowdsourcing to grow your business 2011, Sydney:Advanced Human Technologies
