= Isaac Arthur =

American science communicator

- Born: September 20, 1980 (age 45); Sebastopol, California
- Education: Kent State University (BS)
- Occupations: Science communicator Board of Elections commissioner
- Known for: Science & Futurism with Isaac Arthur
- Spouse: Sarah Fowler Arthur
- Military career
- Allegiance: United States
- Branch: United States Army
- Service years: 2003–2010
- Website: https://www.isaacarthur.net/

Isaac Albert Arthur (born September 20, 1980) is a YouTuber, science educator, futurist and president of the American National Space Society. He is best known as producer of his YouTube channel, Science & Futurism With Isaac Arthur (SFIA), where he discusses a broad variety of topics on futurism and space colonization.

== Early life and education ==
Arthur was raised by his mother and his grandfather, Alan Arthur, along with an older sister. He was homeschooled from the age of ten, and dropped out of high school at age twelve. He received his General Educational Development at the age of sixteen.

In 2001, he graduated at the top of his class with a degree in physics from Kent State University and began to pursue a graduate degree in biophysics. Arthur became involved in local politics and now serves as chairman of the Ashtabula County board of elections. His wife, Sarah Fowler Arthur, has represented Ohio's 99th district in the Ohio state legislature since 2021. Arthur enlisted in the US Army in 2003 and was deployed to Iraq from 2005 to 2007. He left the military in 2010, returning to his home in Ashtabula, Ohio.

== Science & Futurism with Isaac Arthur ==
Arthur guest lectured at the US Air Force Academy, MIT Lincoln Labs, the National Space Society, Trinity Dublin, the Carnegie Science Center, and has been featured frequently in science media.

Arthur serves on his hometown board of elections by day, spending the majority of his personal time working on production of his videos. He collaborates with other science communicators, including Paul Sutter and Fraser Cain, and acts as an analyst and consultant for science fiction novels and games, such as HADES 9. His channel is dedicated to topics including space colonization in the near and far future, futurism, artificial intelligence, and transhumanism, among others, especially in the context of thermodynamics, economics, science fiction, the Fermi paradox, and the Dyson dilemma. The channel's main focus is to speculate on how humanity or other hypothetical advanced civilizations may behave logistically, technologically, and socially, in the near and distant future under the laws of known science.

The channel releases new episodes every Thursday, which tend to be around thirty minutes in length and are roughly organized into series:

- Advanced Civilizations
- Alien Civilizations
- Post Scarcity Civilizations
- Civilizations at the End of Time
- Cyborgs, Androids, Transhumanism & AI
- Fermi Paradox
- Interstellar Warfare
- Megastructures
- Upward Bound
- Outward Bound

Outward Bound's main protagonist is the traveler, featured across the series.

Arthur collaborates with other YouTubers and science communicators.

== National Space Society ==
In 2020, Arthur was named the recipient of the National Space Society Space Pioneer Award for Education via Mass Media for his YouTube channel.

On March 1, 2023, Arthur was elected president of the National Space Society.
