= Raymond Spencer Rodgers =

- Born: 1935
- Died: 5 June 2007 (aged 71–72)

Academic background
- Education: School of International and Public Affairs, Columbia University

Academic work
- Discipline: Futurology
- Institutions: University of Louisiana at Lafayette

Raymond Spencer Rodgers (1935–2007) was a British-born American educator and futurist who spent most of his adult life in Canada.

== Education and early career ==
Born in 1935, Rodgers held a master's degree in International Affairs and a doctorate in Public Law and Government from Columbia University. In 1966 he accepted a teaching position at the University of Southwestern Louisiana (now the University of Louisiana at Lafayette), where he became interested in saving the Cajun French dialect from extinction — an eminent threat by the second half of the twentieth century. "Louisiana should fight to preserve the French language," he noted. "But unless the fight starts now . . . all is lost." Rodgers called for closer ties between south Louisiana and French Canada, and was appointed by Louisiana governor John McKeithen to map out the Quebec-Louisiana Cultural Agreement, which arranged for artistic, educational, and economic exchanges between the two regions. Rodgers was an original member of the Council for the Development of French in Louisiana (CODOFIL), having been appointed to the organization by its first president, former Louisiana congressman Jimmy Domengeaux.

== Rodgers as futurist ==
Rodgers returned to Canada in 1968 to teach at the University of Winnipeg. It was during this period that he renewed an early interest in futurism, particularly in regard to the computer and its possible impact on society. As a result of this reflection, in 1971 Rodgers self-published a booklet on the subject titled Man in the Telesphere. In this essay he described the emergence of an "electronic web" and observed, "The future system is a global society, expressing a kaleidoscope of tastes within a common ethic, eschewing imposition serviced by a multi-directional web of computerized electronic technology and macro/micro transportation; living in a milieu where centers cease to be primarily physical locations; governed by a structure passing to decentralized unity; and unfolding as a transcendental organism dialectically both collectivist and individualistic in capacity."

Among Rodgers' other futurist works was an essay on "transcending the food cycle" in which, according to one author, "He suggested that humanity - perhaps more 'easily' in the future on locations other than the surface of Earth — deliberately seek to transcend the food chain and directly manufacture nutrition from inert materials, for meta-ethical reasons." Rodgers argued that "Life as we know it . . . is predicated on a system — the food chain — in which plants and animals murder one another. Murdering living vegetation is as much a form of predation as any other. . . ."

== Controversy ==
In his later years, Rodgers served as president of Vancouver University Worldwide — described on its web site as "a consortium of globally located public and private institutions" — which in 2007 was ordered by the British Columbia Supreme Court "to stop granting degrees in B.C." because the school was "breaking the province's Degree Authorization Act by offering degrees without permission." Rodgers responded by stating "We don't conduct degree programs in B.C. . . . . The degrees are printed in other jurisdictions and signed outside of B.C. and have been for some time."

== Personal life ==
Rodgers died in the midst of this controversy on June 5, 2007.
