= William Frederic Pendleton =

- Born: March 25, 1845
- Died: November 5, 1927 (aged 82)
- Employer: General Church of the New Jerusalem
- Title: Executive Bishop
- Children: Augusta (Pendleton) Brown, Luele (Pendleton) Caldwell, Venita (Pendleton) Carpenter, Amena (Pendleton) Haines, Freda Pendleton, Korene (Pendleton) Caldwell, Constance Pendleton, Eleora Pendleton, Wertha (Pendleton) Cole and Alan Pendleton.
- Parent(s): Philip Coleman Pendleton; Catherine Sarah Melissa Tabeau

William Frederic Pendleton (March 25, 1845 – November 5, 1927) was the first Executive Bishop of the General Church of the New Jerusalem, in Bryn Athyn, Pennsylvania.

== Biography ==
Born in Savannah, Georgia, Pendleton was the son of Major (C.S.A.) Philip Coleman Pendleton and Catherine Sarah Melissa Tebeau. He became the first Executive Bishop of the General Church of the New Jerusalem in 1897. The General Church had split with the Swedenborgian Church of North America (sometimes known as the General Convention) in 1890 over a doctrinal dispute.

Pendleton served with the 50th Georgia Volunteers, Confederate States of America during the Civil War. He left a record of the battles in which he fought.

1. Second Bull Run or Manassas, August 30, 1862.

2. Chancellorsville, May 3, 1863, in the morning.

3. Salem Church, May 3, 1863, in the afternoon.

4. Gettysburg, July 2, 1863.

5. Knoxville, Tenn., November 2–9, 1863, attack on Fort Sanders.

6. The Wilderness, May 6, 1864.

7. Spotsylvania Court House, May 12, 1864.

8. North Anna River, near Hanover Court House, about May 20, 1864.

9. Cold Harbor, June 1, 1864.

10. Cold Harbor, June 3, 1864.

11. Petersburg, on or about June 16, 1864, a battle in the afternoon and another the same night.

12. Berryville, Shenandoah Valley, September 2, 1864.

13. Cedar Creek, October 19, 1864, in four general engagements during the day, wounded in the last. The first was at daybreak, the second was about sunrise, and the third and fourth were in the afternoon. At the end of the war, he was 20 and a Captain before returning to his home in Valdosta, Georgia.

He graduated from Savannah Medical College and was awarded an MD degree in 1870. He traveled to New York and worked at Bellevue Hospital. On May 28, 1872, he married (Mary) Lawson Young (1851–1938). They had 10 children: Augusta (Pendleton) Brown, Luele (Pendleton) Caldwell, Venita (Pendleton) Carpenter, Amena (Pendleton) Haines, Freda Pendleton, Korene (Pendleton) Caldwell, Constance Pendleton, Eleora Pendleton, Wertha (Pendleton) Cole and Alan Pendleton.

== Publications ==
- The Science of Exposition The Academy Book Room, Bryn Athyn, PA: 1915
- Topics from the Writings The Academy Book Room, Bryn Athyn, PA: 1928
- Notes and Papers on Ritual Academy of the New Church Book Room, Bryn Athyn, PA: 1956.
- Confederate Memoirs, edited by Constance Pendleton, Bryn Athyn, PA: 1958
