= William Beetham =

Painter (1809–1888)

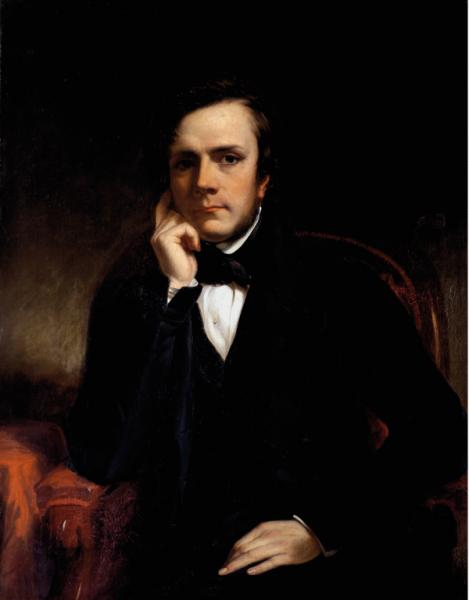
William Beetham Self-portrait 1850s. Beetham Family Collection

William Beetham (25 July 1809 – 3 August 1888) was an English-born portrait painter, who painted mainly in the United Kingdom and New Zealand. He exhibited his paintings at the Royal Academy of Arts in London (1834–53) and painted in Hamburg, Copenhagen and at the court of the Tsar in Saint Petersburg. He emigrated to New Zealand in 1855 and became a significant figure as a colonist, pastoralist and portrait artist. He had a society clientele and received commissions to paint portraits of aristocrats and national leaders, including important Māori Rangatira chiefs. Beetham's paintings are in the permanent collection of the National Portrait Gallery, London and Museum of New Zealand Te Papa Tongarewa in Wellington. He was a founder and President of the New Zealand Academy of Fine Arts in 1882. Mezzotint prints of Beetham's drawings are in the permanent collection of the Science Museum, London Beetham's paintings and drawings have also sold at Bonhams auction house.

== Biography ==
William Beetham R.A. was born in Doncaster, South Yorkshire, England and started his career painting scenes of his home town. His grandfather Joshua Beetham Sr established 'Beetham Wine and Spirits' merchants which lasted for five generations. William established his reputation as a society portraitist, firstly in England by painting portraits (oil on canvas) of noble dignitary such as the Reverend Nathaniel Bond and the former Prime Minister F. J. Robinson, 1st Viscount Goderich (1843). He exhibited frequently at the Royal Academy Of Art, London and travelled overseas to paint in Hamburg, Copenhagen and at the Court of the Tsar in St. Petersburg. His decision to emigrate to New Zealand in 1855 was motivated by the improved financial opportunities in the colonies and a desire to settle his large family of seven sons and three daughters on pastoral land.

Beetham at 46 years of age and a European (pākehā) became one of the early settlers in New Zealand's colonial history when he arrived aboard the William and Jane Steamship at Port Nicholson, Wellington harbour on 1 December 1855. He settled at Te Mako, Taita in the Hutt Valley in 1860 after taking over a lease of land from Māori Chief Wi Tako Ngātata of Te Ātiawa, Ngāti Ruanui and Taranaki iwi, who was the most influential Māori chief in Wellington at that time and lived nearby at Naenae. The land was owned by Alexander Currie, chairman of the directors of the New Zealand Company. After Chief Wi Tako relinquished the lease of Te Mako in 1860, he agreed to have entrusted in Beetham's care a nationally significant Māori pātaka store house Nuku Tewhatewha that he had commissioned in 1856. This was carved by Horonuku Te Heu Heu of Ngāti Tūwharetoa. This taonga remains an important Māori carving and a symbol of solidarity and support to the Māori King movement Kingitanga. It formed one of the seven "Pillars of the Kingdom" (Nga Pou o te Kingitanga) and is the only one to have survived. In 1982, after 122 years of care Hugh Beetham, William's great grandson decided to return the pātaka to the City of Lower Hutt and it is now permanently housed at the Dowse Art Museum. Beetham eventually purchased the Te Mako land in 1876.

In 1856 Beetham also purchased a leasehold for land at Wainuioru in the Wairarapa for his sons, which by 1857 they had developed into the Brancepeth Estate. After the marriage of his eldest daughter Annie Beetham to T.C. Williams in 1858, Brancepeth was rapidly expanded and run by the Beetham-Williams family partnership to become one of the largest pastorals stations in New Zealand with 77,000 acres, 100,000 sheep, 300 employees and a 32 room homestead (10,000 sq ft) of Scottish baronial styled design with battlemented tower. Designed by the architect Joshua Charlesworth, Heritage New Zealand has listed Brancepeth as a Category 1 site. Brancepeth was used as a location for Board meetings of the International Wool Secretariat in 1964 and also visited by H.R.H. Charles, Prince of Wales when he wanted to observe an exemplary sheep station in New Zealand. Brancepeth also welcomed the BBC and Robin Day to film farming in NZ for the British public.

Beetham remained in the Hutt Valley where he farmed a small holding, though painting remained his private and public priority. In accordance with the tradition of Victorian portrait painters, Beetham never signed or dated his work. The subjects were considered of more importance than the artist. Identification of the artist of such work relies on solid provenance. Beetham's first commission to paint Māori came within a month of his arrival to NZ when Tamihana Te Rauparaha requested a posthumous portrait of his father Te Rauparaha, a Māori rangatira Chief and war leader of the Ngāti Toa tribe who composed the famous Haka called Ka Mate. Beetham also painted Te Rauparaha's wife Rita or Ruth. Beetham's portraits of Māori preceded those of C. F. Goldie and Gottfried Lindauer and many commissions followed with the Māori noting Beetham’s accurate painting of the Tā moko. Beetham painted the Māori rangatira chiefs in Regency style to indicate class and status.

Most of the Māori sitters in Beetham's portraits are pictured in formal European dress as many of the younger chiefs had grown up among pakeha and adopted their European dress and hairstyles. Beetham rarely dated or signed his portraits, which was a common practise amongst portrait artists of his era. Beetham’s portraits were popular among Māori and pakeha alike, and his paintings of social groups, urban and rural leaders, children and family groups, provide a fascinating light on social as well as political interactions of the day and the early settlement history of the wider Wellington region.

Set during the aftermath of the New Zealand Company and the early provincial era, Beetham's portrait paintings featured the eminent movers of the day, such as the son of Edward Gibbon Wakefield and William Mein Smith the Surveyor General of the New Zealand Company. Beetham also painted the portrait of Archdeacon Henry Williams (missionary) who translated the Treaty of Waitangi for the British Crown into Te Reo Māori language. Henry's son T.C. Williams was married to Beetham's daughter Anne.

The controversy and implications surrounding the sale of Wellington land between the Māori and the early European settlers is captured in Beetham's nationally significant painting Dr. Featherston and the Maori Chiefs, Wi Tako and Te Puni (1857–58). This features the portraits of Dr. Isaac Featherston NZC and the Māori Rangatira Chiefs Wi Tako Ngātata and Honiana Te Puni (paramount chief of Te Whanganui-a-Tara, Wellington Harbour) and is housed in the permanent collection of the Museum of New Zealand Te Papa Tongarewa in Wellington.

Beetham painted little after the late 1860s, after which he turned to poetry and to establishing a more secure future for the arts in his adopted country. In 1882 Beetham founded the New Zealand Academy of Fine Arts in Wellington and as chair of the Association he formed the objective to promote and encourage fine arts in New Zealand. He also served as President of the Academy.

William Beetham died in Wellington on 3 August 1888 and is buried with his wife at the Bolton Street Memorial Park in Wellington, NZ.

The first major survey of Beetham’s work was presented by the Wairarapa Arts Centre in 1973 and curated by Guy Ramsden. It was to be another 40 years before the most significant exhibition of Beetham's work to date was commissioned and titled Te Rū Movers & Shakers; Early New Zealand Portraits by William Beetham. This was curated by NZ art historian Jane Vial and exhibited at the New Zealand Portrait Gallery in the capital city of Wellington in 2013 followed by a smaller spin-off exhibition titled Close to Home – William Beetham Portraits at Aratoi – Wairarapa Museum of Art and History in Masterton in 2014. The Te Rū exhibition included items from both private and public collections and showcased notable portraits of Chief Wi Tako and of his daughter, which had not previously been seen publicly. Te Āti Awa gifted the Te Rū piece of the exhibition title.

== Personal ==
William Beetham married Mary Horsley at St Georges Parish Church, Doncaster on 25 June 1835. They had ten children together and thirty-two grandchildren. They lived firstly in Hexthorpe near Doncaster before moving to Prospect Street, Horncastle, Lincolnshire and then onto Frimley Hill, Ash Vale, Surrey. From there they emigrated with their family to New Zealand, settling at Te Mako at Taita in the Hutt Valley, Wellington district. William sold the Te Mako property in 1885 and it was later destroyed by fire in 1929. They moved to their final residency in Wellington where Beetham died on 3 August 1888. His funeral attended by the Governor-General of New Zealand. After Beetham's death his wife Mary moved to the home of their daughter Annie and her husband Thomas Coldham Williams at Hobson Street, Wellington. William and Mary are both buried at the Bolton Street Memorial Park, Wellington, NZ. Plot 6801 on Trustees Crescent.

William Beetham was father to 10 children. Those with national recognition in NZ were Richmond Beetham a NZ artist and senior Magistrate of Christchurch, William Henry Beetham a NZ wine pioneer who together with his French wife Marie Zelie Hermance Frere Beetham planted the first pinot noir grapes in NZ in 1888 at their Lansdowne vineyard in Masterton, The wine was tasted by Romeo Bragato the famous viticulturist who considered it exceptional. George Beetham a NZ politician and alpinist who was one of the first Pākehā to discover the crater lake of Mount Ruapehu. His daughter Mary–Margaret Beetham married James Nelson Williams, a notable orchardist and entrepreneur of the early New Zealand colony and the son of William Williams. His daughter Susannah Beetham married the farmer and politician Cecil Fitzroy in 1878.

William Beetham was grandfather to 32 children. Those with national recognition in NZ were Thyra Talvase Bethell MBE a NZ Red Cross organiser. Maude Burge (b. 1865) a NZ artist who trained under C.F. Goldie and became a painting companion of fellow New Zealand artist Frances Hodgkins. Heathcote Beetham Williams who held a law degree from Cambridge University and established Eastwoodhill Arboretum as a charitable trust: the National arboretum of New Zealand, as well as funding the H.B. Williams memorial library in Gisborne, New Zealand.

== Books and publications ==
- Exhibition Catalogue – An exhibition of oils, watercolours, pastels, miniatures and sketches by William Beetham, Wairarapa Arts Centre. 1973
- They Came To Wydrop – by David Yerex. 1991. Hardback. ISBN 1869560248
- Colonial Constructs: European Images of the Maori, 1840–1914 – by Leonard Bell. 1992. Ebook 2013 ISBN 9781869406400
- Reading On The Farm – by Lydia Wevers, a history of the Brancepeth Library. 2011. Paperback. ISBN 9780864736352
- In The Boar's Path: Brancepeth A journey to the heart of a pastoral kingdom – by Gareth Winter & Alex Hedley. 2012. Hardback. ISBN 9780959770346
- Exhibition Catalogue – Te Rū Movers & Shakers: Early New Zealand Portraits by William Beetham. 2013. ISBN 9780473250010.

== Exhibitions ==
- An exhibition of oils, watercolours, pastels, miniatures and sketches by William Beetham. Wairarapa Arts Centre – 1973. Curated by Guy Ramsden
- Te Rū Movers and Shakers – Early New Zealand portraits by William Beetham – New Zealand Portrait Gallery, Wellington, New Zealand, 2013. Curated by Jane Vial.
- Close To Home – William Beetham Portraits – Aratoi Museum, Masterton, New Zealand. 2014
