= Australian Club (Melbourne) =

Gentleman's club formed in 1878

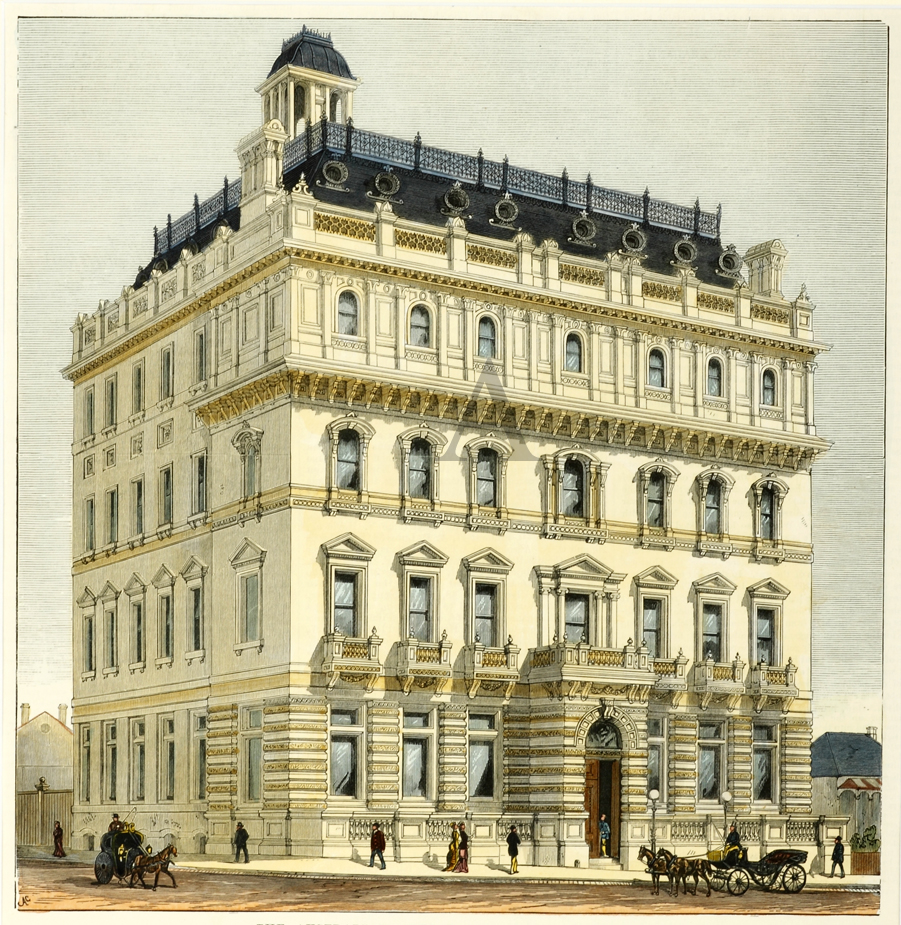
A c.1879 artwork showing the Australian Club building

The Australian Club in Melbourne, Australia is a gentleman's club founded in 1878 by English settlers to provide accommodation, food and refreshments, and congenial surroundings for Melbourne and Victorian businessmen.

The Club is still active and its building at 110 William Street retains its original 19th-century architecture and furniture.

== Architecture ==
The building was designed by Lloyd Tayler in 1879 and erected in two stages in 1879 and 1886 in the Renaissance Revival style of a four storey Italianate palazzo. Tayler himself was expelled from the club shortly afterward. The facade was doubled in width in 1893 by Joshua Charlesworth in a matching symmetrical style. The majority of the building's internal and external fabric is preserved and intact. The portico, loggia, copper mansard roof and cupola were added in 1893 at the end of the land boom.

== Notable members ==
The following notable persons are known to have been members:

- Sir William John Clarke (1831–1897), landowner, stud-breeder and philanthropist
- Sir Ernest Thomas Fisk (1886–1965), radio pioneer and businessman
- Sir Colin Fraser (1875–1944),
- Duncan Gillies (1834–1903), politician
- Rupert W. Hornabrook (1871–1951), anaesthetist
- Sir Harry Sutherland Wightman Lawson (1875–1952), politician and lawyer
- Sir James MacBain (1828–1892), businessman and politician
- John Alexander MacPherson (1833–1894), politician
- Sir Norman Angus Martin (1893–1978), farmer, grazier and politician
- Alexander Morrison (1829–1903), schoolmaster
- Sir William Herbert Phillipps (1847–1935), merchant and philanthropist in SA
- Sir Alfred Roberts (1823–1898), surgeon
- William Rutledge (1806–1876), merchant, banker and settler
- Edmund Edmonds Smith (1847–1914), ship-owner
- Sir Sydney Snow (1887–1958), retailer
- Sir Colin Syme (1903–1986), businessman
- Col. P. W. Vaughan (1871–1945), banker
- William Irving Winter-Irving (1840–1901), pastoralist
- Charles William Wren (1856–1934), banker
