= Maarten Wevers =

New Zealand diplomat and public servant

Sir Maarten Wevers KNZM
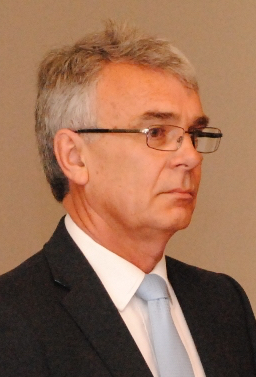
- Wevers in 2012

Chief Executive of the Department of the Prime Minister and Cabinet
- In office 2004–2012
- Prime Minister: Helen Clark; John Key
- Preceded by: Mark Prebble
- Succeeded by: Andrew Kibblewhite

Ambassador to Japan
- In office 1994–1997
- Monarch: Elizabeth II
- Prime Minister: Jim Bolger
- Preceded by: David McDowell
- Succeeded by: Neil Walter

High Commissioner to Papua New Guinea
- In office 1993–1994
- Prime Minister: Jim Bolger
- Preceded by: John Hayes
- Succeeded by: John Clarke

Personal details
- Born: 24 March 1952 (age 74) Hengelo, Netherlands
- Relatives: Lydia Wevers (sister)

Sir Maarten Laurens Wevers KNZM (born 24 March 1952) is a New Zealand diplomat and public servant, who served as New Zealand's High Commissioner to Papua New Guinea and Ambassador to Japan. He was the Chief Executive of the Department of the Prime Minister and Cabinet from 2004 to 2012.

Wevers was born in Hengelo, Netherlands, on 24 March 1952 and emigrated to New Zealand when he was just over one year old. He became a naturalised New Zealand citizen in 1954. He is brother to Professor Lydia Wevers (Director of the Stout Research Centre at Victoria University).

Wevers was educated at Rathkeale College from 1965 to 1969, and went on to Victoria University of Wellington, graduating with a BSc and BA (Hons) in economics. He joined the Ministry of Foreign Affairs, European Division, in 1977 and in 1982 was Second Secretary at the New Zealand Embassy in Japan. From 1985 to 1987 he was Private Secretary to the Prime Minister and Minister of Foreign Affairs, David Lange, in Wellington before being seconded to the Institute of Policy Studies at Victoria University of Wellington to undertake research on relations between Japan and New Zealand.

Between 1989 and 1992, Wevers served as Counsellor in the New Zealand Embassy, Brussels before becoming High Commissioner to Papua New Guinea (1993–1994) and as Ambassador to Japan (1994–1997).

In 1999, Wevers was appointed Chair of the APEC Senior Officials Meeting, during New Zealand’s APEC year. In the 2000 New Year Honours, he was appointed a Companion of the New Zealand Order of Merit, for services to the 1999 APEC summit.

In 2000, Wevers left the Ministry of Foreign Affairs to become regional director of New Zealand Post International Limited and General Manager, Government Business, for New Zealand Post Limited. In 2002 he became a general manager of Transcend Worldwide, New Zealand Post's international subsidiary.

In 2004, Wevers was appointed Chief Executive of the Department of the Prime Minister and Cabinet.

In the 2012 Queen's Birthday and Diamond Jubilee Honours, he was appointed a Knight Companion of the New Zealand Order of Merit (KNZM) the first CE of the Department of Prime Minister and Cabinet to have been recognised in this way.

In 2013, he was appointed Chairman of the Board of the Earthquake Commission, a provider of natural disaster insurance for residential property, administering the Natural Disaster Fund, and funding research and education on natural disasters and ways of reducing their impact.

In 2018, he resigned as chairman and from the board of the Earthquake Commission, having lost the confidence of the minister responsible.
