= Chevy Chase (house) =

Heritage-listed house in Melbourne, Victoria, Australia

- Location of the mansion in Greater Metropolitan Melbourne
- Former names: Bona Park
- Etymology: The Ballad of Chevy Chase

General information
- Status: Completed
- Type: Mansion
- Architectural style: Victorian Italianate
- Location: 201 Were Street, Brighton, City of Bayside, Melbourne, Victoria, Australia
- Coordinates: 37°55′34″S 145°00′28″E
- Completed: 1881; 145 years ago
- Renovated: 1960s
- Client: Andrew Thompason

Technical details
- Material: Bluestone; rendered bricks; cast iron; slate
- Floor count: 3, including tower
- Grounds: 4.0 ha (10 acres) (1881); 3,958 m^{2} (42,600 sq ft) (2022)

Design and construction
- Architect: Frederick Williams

Renovating team
- Architect: Alistair Knox (1960s)

Victorian Heritage Register
- Official name: Chevy Chase
- Type: Registered place
- Designated: 28 November 1979
- Reference no.: H0125
- Heritage overlay no.: HO385
- Category: Residential buildings (private)

Register of the National Estate
- Official name: Chevy Chase
- Type: Defunct register
- Designated: 21 March 1978
- Reference no.: 5727

Chevy Chase is a mansion located at 201 Were Street in Brighton, in the City of Bayside, in the south eastern suburbs of Melbourne, in Victoria, Australia.

Built in 1881 on the traditional lands of the Bunurong people, the mansion was added to the Victorian Heritage Register on 28 November 1979 in recognition of its historical and architectural significance; and was also added to non-statutory lists by the Victorian branch of the National Trust on 27 January 1966 and the now defunct Register of the National Estate on 21 March 1978.

The name of the house is derived from The Ballad of Chevy Chase, a Scottish ballad.

== History ==
In 1881, Scottish migrants, Andrew Thomson (Note: Sometimes incorrectly spelled as Thompson.) and John Niven, book publishers, (Note: Thomson and Niven were the local agents and importers for William Collins, Sons, the Scottish publisher who had recently been granted rights to publish The Bible. Thomson and Niven later published in Australia and New Zealand as McGready, Thomson and Niven.) purchased 39 acres (16 ha) and built twin mansions approximately 100 metres (330 ft) apart. Thomson built Chevy Chase, initially called Bona Park; and Niven built Hiawatha, later called Ratho Park. (Note: Ratho Park was acquired in 1949 by the Catholic Sisters of St John of God for use as a hospital, until its closure in 1999 and subsequent sale.) Both of the houses were designed by Frederick Williams (Note: There are several media articles that state Lloyd Tayler (spelled as Lloyd Taylor) was the architect. However, no independent sources could be located to confirm this statement; and other more reliable sources state that Williams designed both houses.) in the Victorian Italianate style during the Melbourne land boom period. Each house stood on its own four-hectare (ten-acre) allotment, with the remaining area devoted to their shared gardens.

Thomson returned to the United Kingdom in c. 1885 and sold the property to John Binnie and his wife Janet, who renamed the property from Bona Park to Chevy Chase. Binnie was an importer associated with Ball & Welch, and who served as a director of the pastoral family company, Webster Limited. The Binnie family lived in Chevy Chase until c. 1920s, and by 1927, Binnie was living in Turramurra, in Sydney.

In May 1926, there were calls for the local council to purchase the mansion as the Victorian government considered acquiring the house and grounds to establish a mental asylum. However, by November that year, Chevy Chase was subdivided and sixty allotments, excluding the mansion, were sold at auction. By 1930, the owners of the mansion were Mr and Mrs R. A. Horne.

In 1979, Chevy Chase was purchased by Darren and Jennifer Overend for $360,000. They spent the next thirty years restoring the house. The Overends sold the property in 2022 for between $12.7 million and $13.2 million. As of October 2022, the property comprised a six-bedroom four-bathroom house, a recreational pavilion, and a gazebo, with a view of its 12.5-metre-long (41 ft) swimming pool, spa, and rolling lawns, with parking for fourteen cars.

== Description ==
Chevy Chase exhibits a large two storey cast-iron verandah which follows around the north-west and south faces of the building reflecting the form of the two bay windows located on the west facade. The house is otherwise dominated by a three-storey tower with parapet balustrading and urns intact at each corner. Under the verandah the house is entered via a recessed entrance portico, and the wall treatment, with the exception of the projecting wings at the termination points of the verandah, is very austere. The windows are capped by segmental arches on the ground floor and flat lintels on the first floor. On the projecting wings, at the termination of the verandah, a moulding runs around the surface of the facade that forms a mock entablature below the stilted segmental arches of the whole mouldings. The roof of the house is mainly slate although some repairs have been carried out using iron. The exterior has been painted white, with charcoal coloured cast iron. Internally the house has been repainted with the exception of the dining room and light well, both of which are in original condition.

Chevy Chase stands on approximately four thousand square metres (one acre), much reduced from its original estate. The house is approached via a short driveway entering from Were Street. The original garden concept is much altered. A substantial amount of the area in which the house now stands is the remnants of the garden precinct; and located on the eastern boundary of the site is a large hall-like two-storey modern brick building constructed in the 1960s and designed by Alistair Knox.

Being a relatively intact example of one of the large mansion houses which once formed the basic character of the Brighton area and possessing a particularly fine verandah, Chevy Chase is a building of considerable architectural and historic importance set within its garden precinct.

The battle-axe type subdivision wraps around the verandah of the house without in any way reducing the distance between thu title boundary and the house as it exists at present. The area to be excised from the designation is relatively distant from the house and does not significantly alter the planning context in which the building sits.

== See also ==
- Architecture of Melbourne
- List of places on the Victorian Heritage Register in the City of Bayside
