= Elizabeth Webby =

Australian literary critic and academic (1942–2023)

- Born: Elizabeth Anne Loder; 9 February 1942; Sydney, New South Wales, Australia
- Died: 6 August 2023 (aged 81); Sydney, New South Wales, Australia
- Occupations: Literary critic, editor, Australian literature scholar

Academic background
- Education: Presbyterian Ladies' College, Sydney
- Alma mater: University of Sydney
- Thesis: Literature and the reading public in Australia 1800–1850: A study of the growth and differentiation of a colonial literary culture during the earlier nineteenth century (1971)

Academic work
- Discipline: Australian literature
- Institutions: University of Sydney

Elizabeth Anne Webby AM FAHA (née Loder; 9 February 1942 – 6 August 2023) was an Australian literary critic, editor and scholar of literature. Emeritus Professor Webby retired from the Chair of Australian Literature at the University of Sydney in 2007. She edited The Cambridge Companion to Australian Literature (Melbourne, 2000) and was editor of Southerly from 1988 to 1999.

== Early life and education ==
Elizabeth Anne Loder was born in Sydney on 9 February 1942, to George Loder and his wife Betty Ellis. She completed her secondary education at Presbyterian Ladies' College, Sydney and then attended the University of Sydney. She married Barry Webby in 1966.

== Career ==
Webby was first employed as a tutor in English Literature at the University of Sydney in 1965. Her academic career progressed at that University and she became Professor of Australian Literature in 1990. Upon retirement in 2007, she became Emeritus Professor of Australian Literature. In recognition of her retirement, The University of Queensland Press and Australian Literary Studies jointly published New Reckonings : Australian literature past, present, future : Essays in honour of Elizabeth Webby, edited by Leigh Dale and Brigid Rooney, in 2007.

From 1988 to 1999 Webby was the editor of Southerly. She had two terms as chair of the judging panel for the Nita B Kibble Literary Awards for Australian women's life writing, in 1992–96 and 2005–07. In 1999–2004 she was a judge for the Miles Franklin Award.

Webby donated her 1974–2002 papers, including correspondence, research and material relating to Southerly to the State Library of New South Wales on her retirement in June 2007.

Elizabeth Webby died on 6 August 2023, at the age of 81.

== Selected bibliography ==
=== As author ===
- Modern Australian Plays, Sydney University Press, Melbourne, 1990, ISBN 0424001527

=== As editor ===
- Early Australian Poetry : An annotated bibliography of original poems published in Australian newspapers, magazines & almanacks before 1850, Hale & Ironmonger, Sydney, 1982, ISBN 0908094914
- Happy Endings : Stories by Australian and New Zealand women, 1850s–1930s, co-editor with Lydia Wevers, Allen & Unwin, North Sydney, 1987, ISBN 086861419X
- Colonial Voices : Letters, diaries, journalism and other accounts of nineteenth-century Australia, University of Queensland Press, 1989, ISBN 9780702221712
- Memory, co-editor with Ivor Indyk, Collins/Angus & Robertson, Pymble, 1991, ISBN 0207170592
- Poetry, co-editor with Ivor Indyk, Collins/Angus & Robertson, Pymble, 1992, ISBN 0207177112
- Reconnoitres : Essays in Australian literature in honour of G.A. Wilkes, co-editor with Margaret Harris, Oxford University Press in association with Sydney University Press, Melbourne, 1992, ISBN 0424001810
- Goodbye to Romance : Stories by Australian and New Zealand women, 1930s–1980s, co-editor with Lydia Wevers, Allen & Unwin, Wellington, New Zealand, 1989, ISBN 0046140190
- The Cambridge Companion to Australian Literature, Cambridge University Press, New York, 2000, ISBN 9780521658430
- Walter and Mary : The letters of Walter and Mary Richardson, co-editor with Gillian Sykes, Melbourne University Press, 2000, ISBN 0522849237

== Awards and recognition ==
- Fellow of the Australian Academy of the Humanities, 1997
- Centenary Medal, 2001, "For service to Australian society and the humanities in the study of Australian literature."
- A. A. Phillips Award, presented by the Association for the Study of Australian Literature (ASAL) "For services to the teaching and research of Australian Literature."
- Member of the Order of Australia (AM), 2004 Australia Day Honours, "For service to the study, teaching and promotion of Australian literature, for support to Australian authors, and for fostering links between the academic and general reading communities."
