= St Barnabas Church, Roseneath =

St Barnabas Church
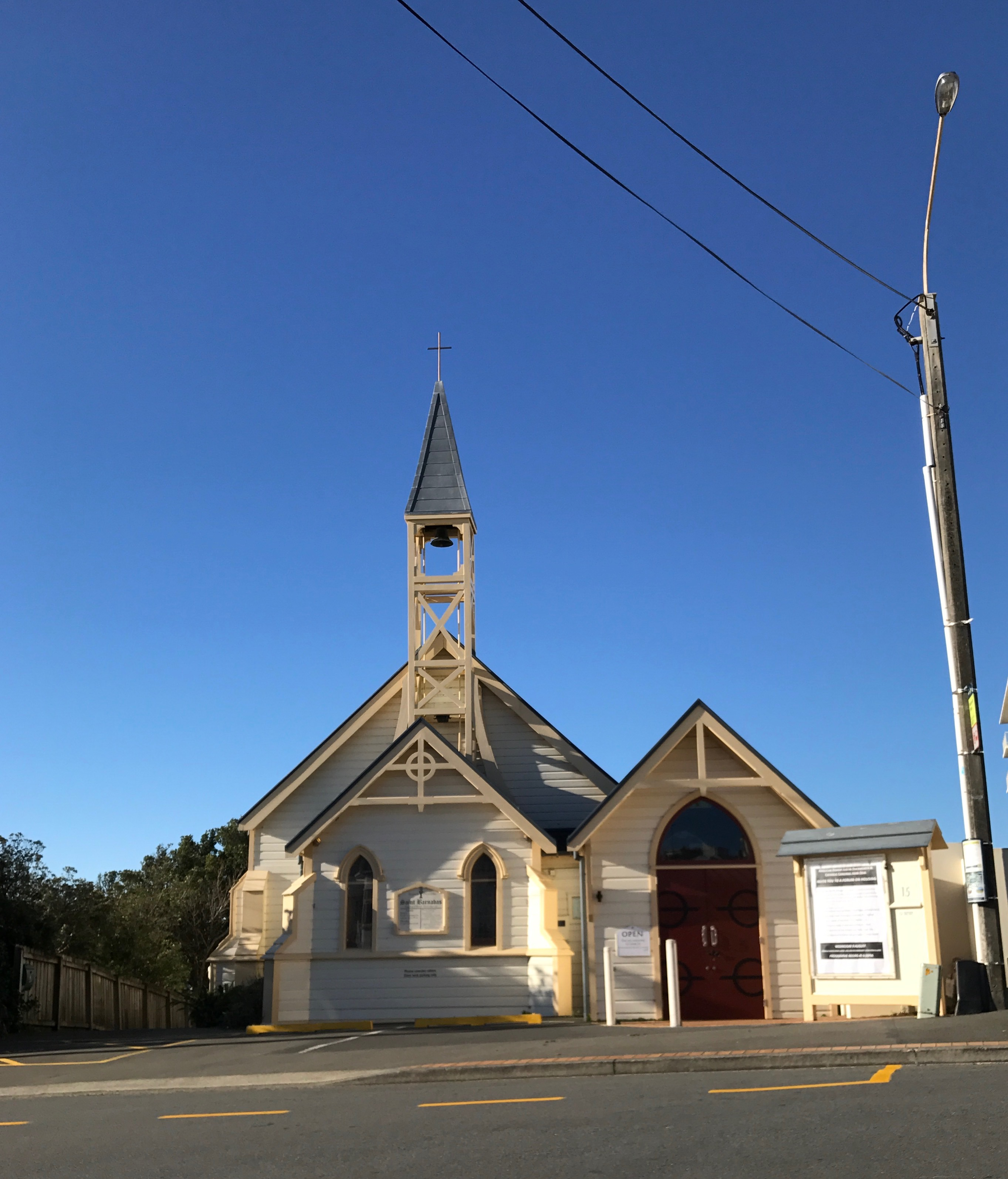
- St Barnabas Church in 2017
- St Barnabas Church
- 41°17′15.09″S 174°48′08.03″E
- Address: 15 Maida Vale Road, Wellington
- Country: New Zealand
- Denomination: Anglican
- Churchmanship: Anglo-Catholic
- Website: stbarnabasroseneath.org.nz

Architecture
- Architects: Joshua Charlesworth (1899); Frederick de Jersey Clere (1910)
- Architectural type: Church
- Style: Gothic Revival
- Years built: 1899

Specifications
- Materials: Timber

Administration
- Province: Anglican Church in Aotearoa, New Zealand and Polynesia
- Diocese: Wellington
- Parish: Roseneath and Oriental Bay, Wellington

Clergy
- Vicar: Cath Growcott

Heritage New Zealand – Category 2
- Designated: 25 November 1982
- Reference no.: 1421

St Barnabas Church is an heritage-listed Anglican church located in Roseneath, Wellington, New Zealand.

The building was registered by Heritage New Zealand as a Category 2 Historic Place on 25 November 1982, with registration number 1421.

The timber church was designed by Joshua Charlesworth in the Gothic Revival style and opened in 1899. It suffered fire damage in 1924 and the repairs were designed by Frederick de Jersey Clere. Clere also designed the belfry in 1910.

The church is part of the parish of Roseneath and Oriental Bay in the Diocese of Wellington.

Interior views of the church

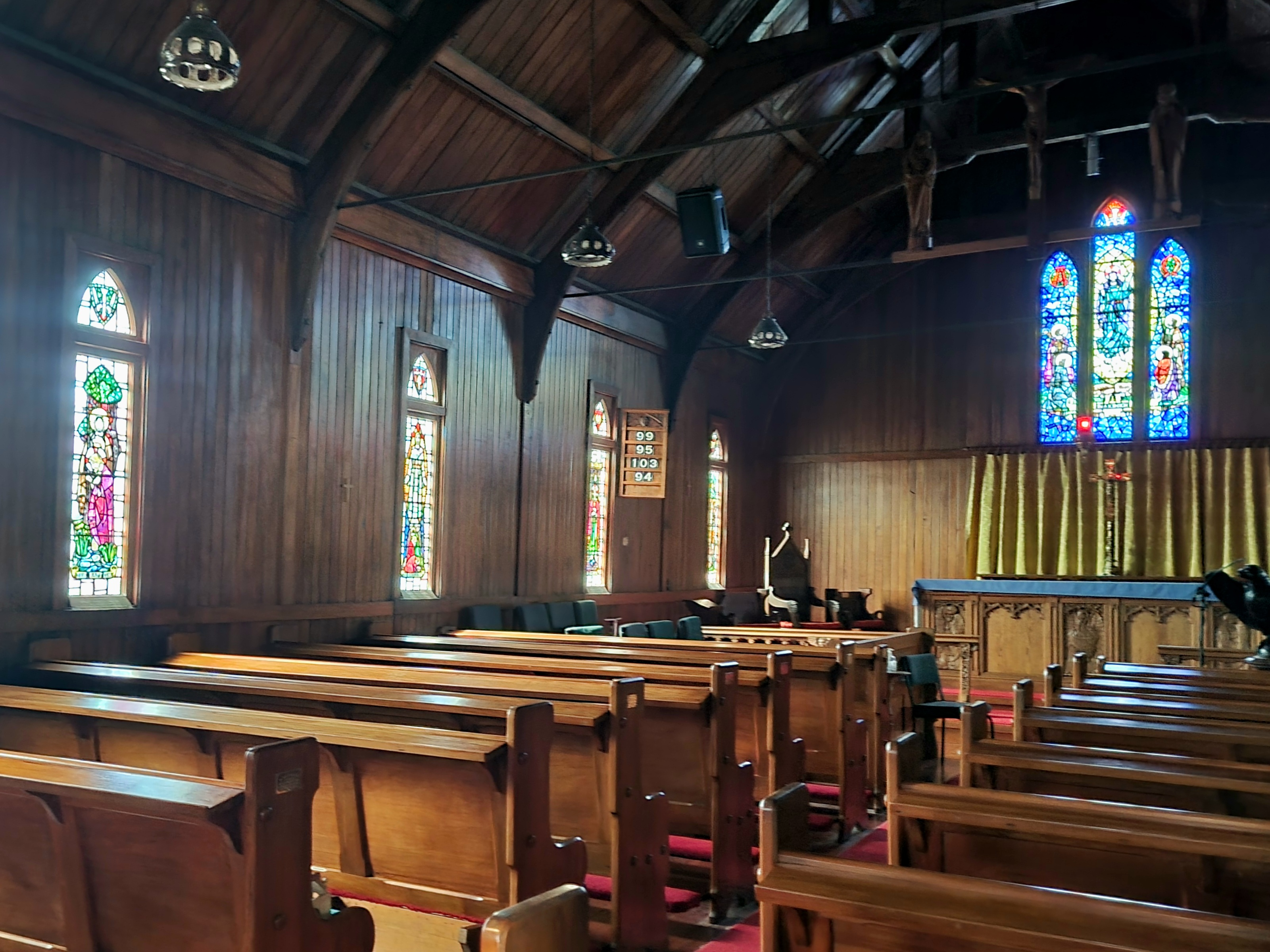

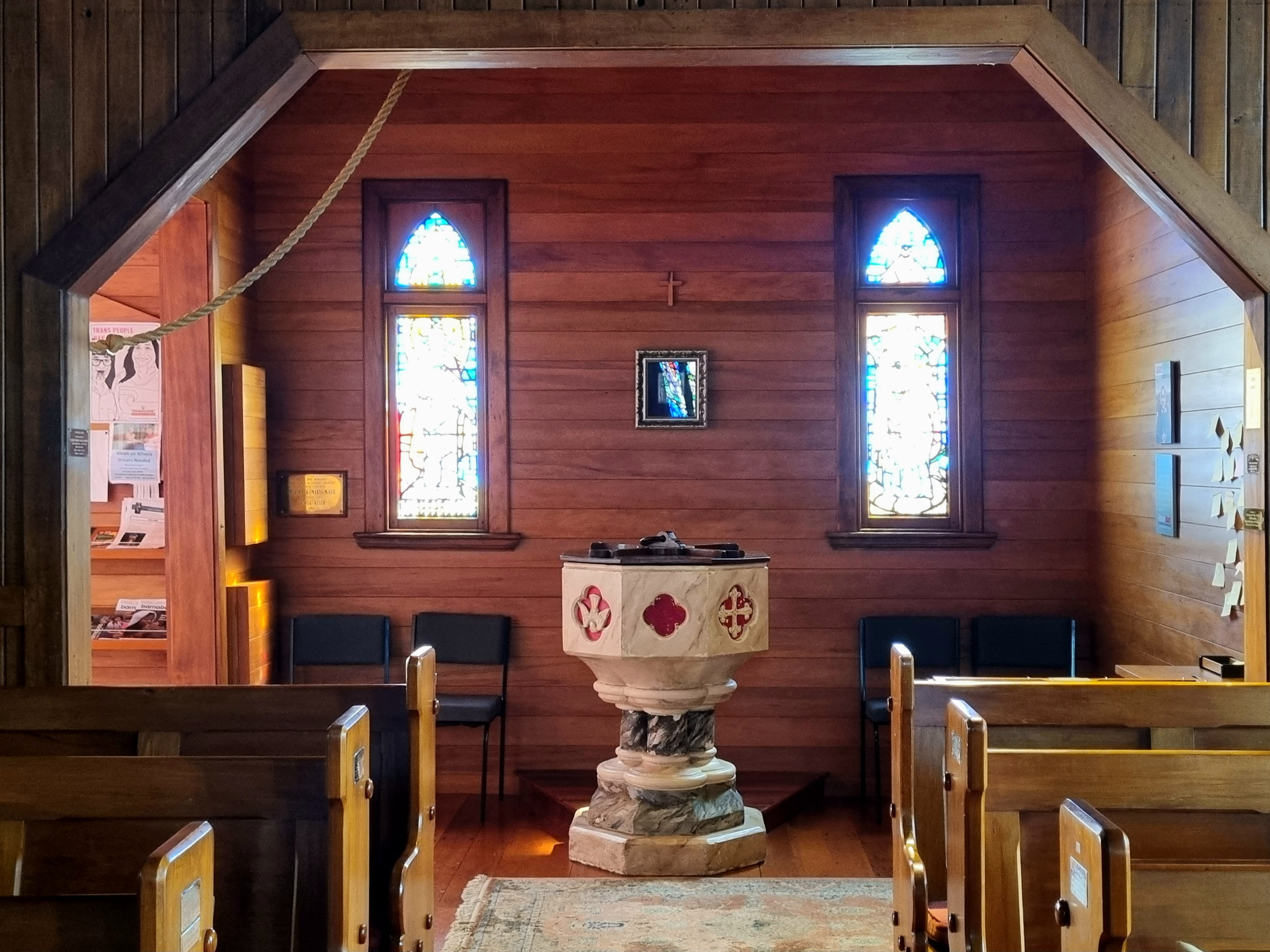

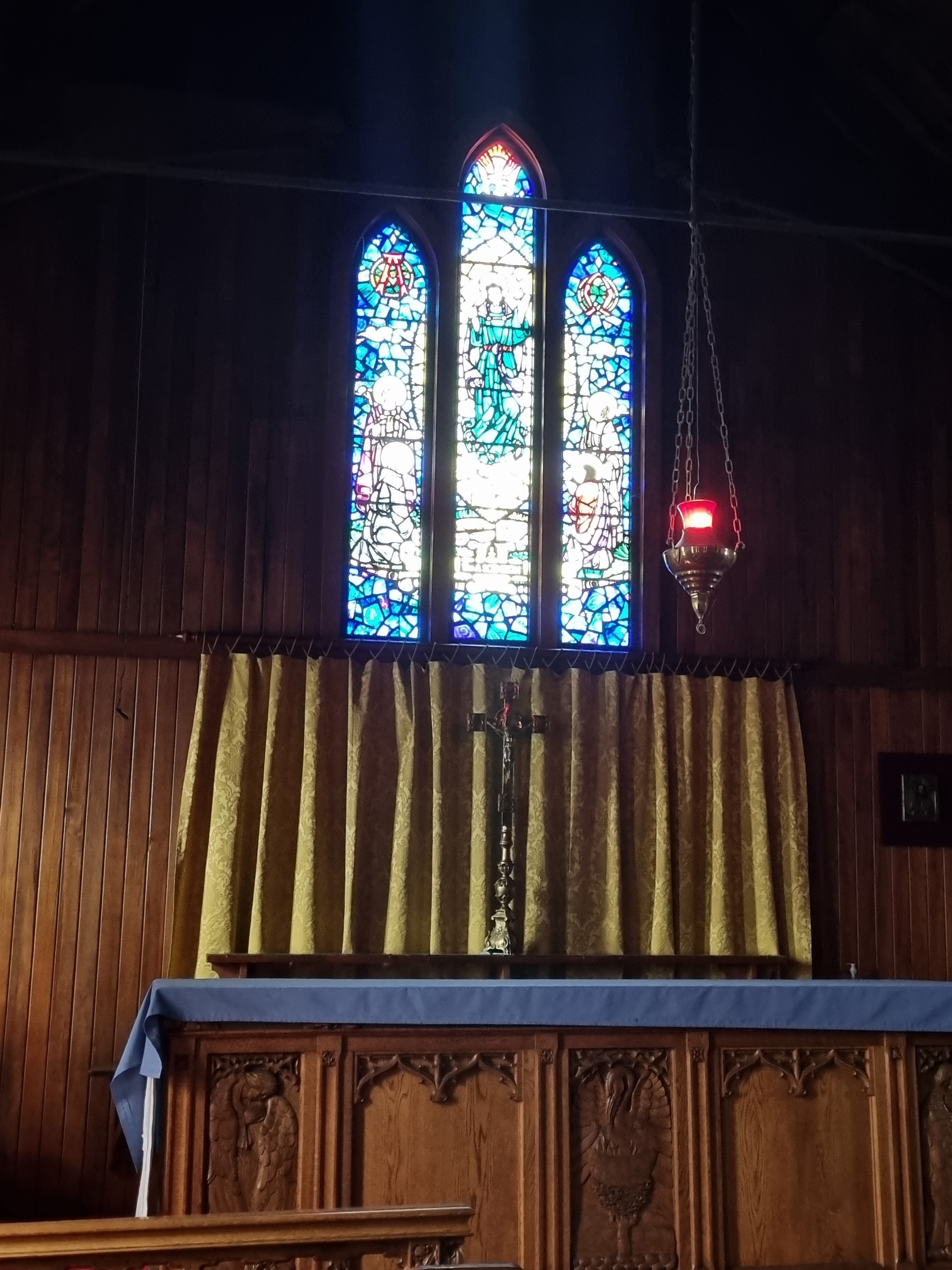
