= P. W. Vaughan =

Percy William Vaughan (28 May 1871 – 5 October 1945), known as Colonel Vaughan, was a bank manager and officer in the Australian Army.

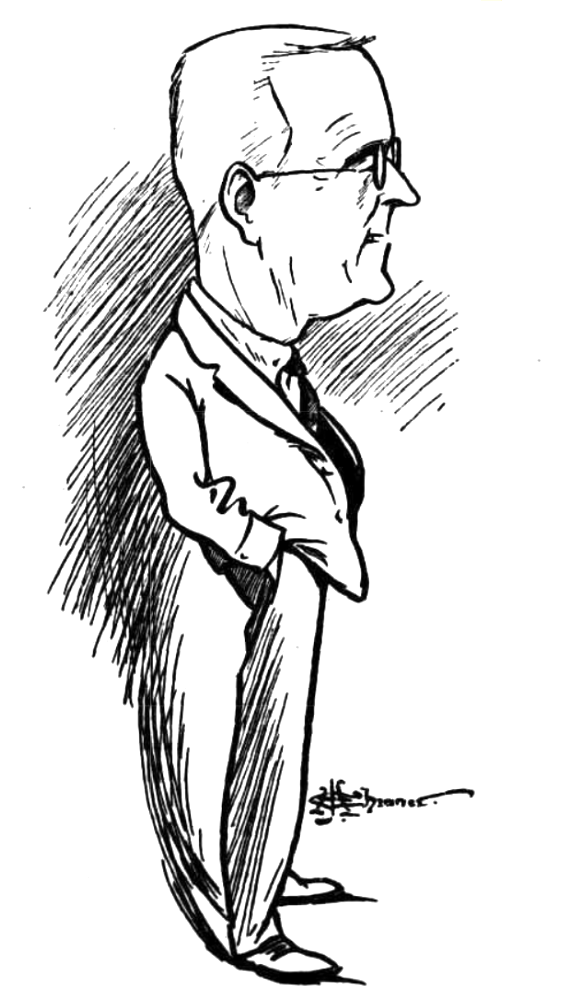
caricature by J. H. Chinner

== History ==
The second son of Rev. Canon John Vaughan (1841 – 20 December 1918) and Annie Vaughan (died 1 August 1926) of Sydney, he was born in Hereford, England, and came to Australia with his parents at the age of ten, and was educated at Sydney Grammar School.

He joined the City Bank of Sydney (Note: The City Bank of Sydney was founded in 1863 and did not close in the crisis of 1893. It was taken over by the Australian Bank of Commerce in 1917.) and by 1903 was manager of the bank's Kiama branch and Newcastle by 1909. He was still an employee when made JP in May 1914, and around that time joined the Commonwealth Bank as first manager of their Newcastle branch. He joined the Commonwealth Bank in 1914. and was still managing the Newcastle branch in June 1915. In August 1915 he left the bank as he had enlisted for overseas service; his replacement was G. A. Ball, previously of the Dubbo branch.

In 1900 he was one of four Lieutenants of the Sydney Light Horse Volunteers (later 1st Royal New South Wales Lancers) under Captain Robert Roland Thompson. and was sent to South Africa during the Boer War. The Australian Horse became the First Australian Horse in 1901 and Vaughan was appointed Lieutenant. He was promoted to Captain in 1905, Major in 1912. At the outbreak of WWI he was made Provost marshal for the Newcastle district, then demobilised.
Around November 1915 he applied for a commission in the First AIF, (Note: Unusually, in his application he requested that correspondence that would normally go to a next-of-kin be sent instead to his father-in-law, J. M. Sandy) and as Major Vaughan was put in charge of the NSW camp in Egypt. In November 1916 promoted to Lieut. Colonel in charge of a training unit in France.
He was a longtime sufferer from laryngitis, and was repatriated in 1918 due to this chronic condition, and his appointment was terminated in March 1918.
He was given the honorary rank of Colonel in May 1931.

Vaughan succeeded A. S. Douglas as manager of the Hobart branch in April 1918.

He moved to Adelaide in June 1919, taking over from acting manager M. B. Young. In August 1919 he was appointed to the Central War Loan Committee of South Australia.

He left for Melbourne in September 1928, replacing W. H. Kelman as manager; his replacement in Adelaide was T. C. Irving.

He retired in 1937. He died at his home at Washington Street, Toorak, and his remains were cremated at Springvale.

== Other interests ==
- He was hon. secretary of Braidwood Hospital in 1893.
- He was hon. secretary for a variety of charitable collections: Lady Weigall's button day, Dr Barnado's Homes and the 1928 Australian Olympic Federation appeal.
- Vaughan was involved with the Red Cross Society and while resident in Adelaide was South Australian representative on the Australian Red Cross Council.
- He was a member of Royal Melbourne Golf Club and the Senior Golfers' Association
- He was a member of the Australian Club.

== Family ==
Vaughan married Ellen Linda Montague Sandy (10 September 1883 – 1965), eldest daughter of J(ames) Montague Sandy (died 16 July 1921) and Evaline Martha Sandy, née Backhouse (died 2 January 1925), on 26 September 1903.

- Kenneth Montague Vaughan (3 September 1906 – 1995) served as Captain in WWII
- Mildred Evelyn Vaughan (1907–1993) married William Hudson in 1946
- Phyllis Beatrice Vaughan (1910–1993) married John Holden Illingworth in 1945

In 1915 lived at "Blenheim" on Burwood Rd, Burwood, Victoria, the home of the Sandy family.
