= Lucelle Frances Beetham =

New Zealand artist

- Born: 24 March 1842; Hutt Valley, New Zealand
- Died: 11 October 1910 (aged 68); Nelson, New Zealand
- Known for: Natural history illustration
- Spouse: Richmond Beetham (m. 1863–1910)

Lucelle Frances Beetham (née Swainson; 24 March 1842 – 11 October 1910) was a New Zealand artist and natural history illustrator.

== Personal life ==
Lucelle Frances Swainson was born on 24 March 1842, the second daughter of the naturalist William Swainson and Anne Grasby. She grew up in the Hutt Valley; on 17 September 1863 she married magistrate and artist Richmond Beetham, moving with him to Queenstown in the 1870s. She died in 1910, aged 68.

== Artwork ==
Beetham took after her artist father and was a talented illustrator, producing several botanical and bird studies. Some of her works are now held in the Alexander Turnbull Library in Wellington.
