= Kenneth Asprey =

Australian judge (1905–1993)

The Honourable Kenneth Asprey CMG, QC
- Born: 15 July 1905; Sydney, Australia
- Died: 28 October 1993 (aged 88); Sydney, Australia
- Education: Newington College; University of Sydney
- Occupations: Solicitor; Queen's Counsel; Judge; Royal Commissioner
- Spouses: Margaret (m. 1935, died) Mary née Snow (m. 1977)
- Children: 2 daughters
- Parent: W Asprey
- Relatives: Sydney Snow (father-in-law)

Kenneth William Asprey CMG QC (15 July 1905 – 28 October 1993) was an Australian judge. He was judge of the New South Wales Court of Appeal, the highest court in the State of New South Wales, Australia, which forms part of the Australian court hierarchy.

He came to public prominence as a Royal Commissioner appointed to the second Voyager Royal Commission and on handing down of his review of the tax system in Australia in 1975. Although controversial at the time, the Asprey report on taxation has acted "as a guide and inspiration to governments and their advisers for the following 25 years." The main recommendations of the report have all been implemented and are today part of Commonwealth taxation in Australia.

Professor Gillian Triggs, Dean of the University of Sydney Law School, at the 2011 launch of the Asprey Law Library Collection, described him as being "widely regarded as a leader of the NSW Bar. He was a noted mentor of young barristers, greatly admired by them and by his peers. He was a justice of the inaugural NSW Court of Appeal, and a Companion of the Order of St Michael and St George was awarded to him in recognition of his services to the law."

== Early life ==
Asprey was born in Sydney and educated at Newington College (1914–1922) and the University of Sydney (1923–1928), where he graduated in arts and law.

== Legal career ==
In 1929, Asprey commenced practising as a solicitor and in 1929 went to the bar. He took silk in 1952 and was appointed to the Supreme Court of New South Wales in 1962. On its commencement in 1966, he was appointed to the NSW Court of Appeal. In the same year he was appointed to the second Voyager Royal Commission. Asprey retired from the bench in 1975. An obituary, written by Sir Anthony Mason, was published in The Sydney Morning Herald on 5 November 1993. At the opening of the 2008 law term Mason spoke of his memories of working with Asprey.

== Government appointments ==
- Chairman, NSW Parliamentary Remuneration Tribunal (1975–1976)
- Chairman, Commonwealth Tax Review Committee (1972–1975)

== Honours ==
- Companion of the Order of St Michael and St George (1977) in recognition of service to the government

== Asprey Law Library Collection ==
In 2011, Asprey’s daughter, Sally Stitt, and her husband, Robert Stitt QC, donated his law library to the University of Sydney. Known as the Asprey Law Library Collection, it features a comprehensive array of English and Australian law journals, reports and textbooks, with some reports dating back to the early days of the Colony. Many of the journals contain Asprey's detailed annotations.
