= Lloyd Tayler =

Australian architect (1830–1900)

Lloyd Tayler FRIBA
- Born: October 26, 1830; London, England
- Died: 17 August 1900 (aged 69); Brighton, Victoria, Australia
- Resting place: Brighton General Cemetery
- Education: Mill Hill Grammar School; King's College London
- Occupation: Architect
- Known for: Australian Club, Melbourne; Joint design of Parliament House, Adelaide; National Bank of Australasia buildings; Commercial Bank of Australia headquarters, Melbourne
- Spouse: Sarah Toller (m. 1858; died 1900)
- Children: 5

Lloyd Tayler (26 October 1830 – 17 August 1900) was an English architect in Melbourne, Victoria. Several family members subsequently used "Lloyd-Tayler" as a double-barreled surname.

== History ==
Tayler was born in London, the youngest son of merchant William Tayler and Priscilla Tayler, née Lloyd, of St John's Wood, London. He was educated at Mill Hill Grammar School, an establishment of the Independent Church, of which his father was an adherent. He was an apt and successful student and in 1846 was sent to the Sorbonne for a liberal education, and became involved in the heady atmosphere of Parisian politics. In 1848 he began a course of study at the Department of Applied Sciences at King's College London, in his third year winning several prizes. His career as an architect began as a pupil of the civil engineer H. J. Castle of Adelphi Chambers, London, and a Mr Molesworth, district surveyor of Southwark. In 1850, following the death of a brother Richard Tayler, he inherited a share of a sheep station near Albury in New South Wales. In June 1851 he left London to assist his brother Alfred, who was a partner in the enterprise, only to learn, when he landed in October 1851, that the whole property — flocks and herds, homestead, outbuildings and machinery — had been destroyed in the bushfires of 6 February 1851, dubbed "Black Thursday". This was the time of the great Victorian gold finds, and Taylor joined a party of professional men in the rush to Mount Alexander, where he was successful, and progressed from digging to gold buying; one of his clients was the future Town Clerk of Melbourne, E. G. Fitzgibbon.

Tayler returned to Melbourne in 1854 and set himself up in practice as an architect in partnership with Lewis Vieusseux (died 31 March 1899), a civil engineer. His partner had higher ambitions however, and within two years quit, and with his wife established a Ladies' College in East Melbourne. Tayler had hoped, on leaving England, to catch up with an old schoolmate from Mill Hill, Thomas Northcote Toller, son of the Rev. Thomas Toller of Kettering, but found too late that his friend had died. He did however meet his sister, Sarah Toller; they married at St Andrew's Church of England, Brighton, on 9 September 1858, and raised a small family.

His long and successful architectural practice included designing several churches and large buildings, but also residences for several high-profile clients: Hon. C. E. Bright at Toorak, William Bayles, James Service at St Kilda, Dr. Bowen, W. K. Thomas, W. W. Couche, of Couche Calder and Company, and F. C. Lange of Lange and Thoneman.

In 1868 Tayler submitted his competitive design for the National Bank of Australasia, in Collins-street, and being successful was entrusted with erection of the building.

In 1870 Tayler's design for the Melbourne Exhibition was awarded second prize. That design received a medal at the Sydney Exhibition. He was appointed a commissioner for the Exhibition of 1879-80, representing the Royal Institute of British Architects. He was also interested in public health, being on the Council of the Health Society and a founder of the Melbourne branch of the St John Ambulance Association, later chairman, and was variously vice-president and president of the Royal Victorian Institute of Architects.

After practicing in Melbourne from 1854 to 1874, he took a two years' holiday in England and Europe increasing his professional credentials. In 1874 he teamed up with Edmund W. Wright, of Adelaide, in competitions for the Bank of South Australia, and for the new Parliament House, both being awarded first prize. In 1875 he was made a fellow of the Royal Institute of British Architects.

In 1877 Tayler returned to Melbourne and architecture, and was made a Justice of the Peace in the following year.

He designed the premises of the New Zealand Loan and Mercantile Agency Company on Collins Street, the Australian Club on William Street, the Melbourne Exchange, warehouses for James Service and Company and for George Robertson and Company. Tayler and Alfred Dunn (1865–1894) managed the Commercial Bank of Australia building in Collins Street.

In 1889 the Victorian Institute became the Royal Victorian Institute and Tayler was its first president. In 1891 he took his old pupil and later assistant, Frederick A. Fitts, into partnership. Fitts took over the business but only outlived his partner by a year, as he died in a boating accident.

Tayler maintained an active interest in architecture after retirement, and at the 1890 Australasian Science Congress in Melbourne contributed an interesting history of Melbourne's buildings.

Tayler died at his residence Pen-y-Bryn, Middle Crescent, North Brighton, Victoria.

== Family ==
Tayler (died 17 August 1900) married Sarah Toller (1834 – 15 December 1912) on 9 September 1858. Sarah was a daughter of Rev. Thomas Toller (died 30 November 1885), of Kettering. They had four daughters and one son:

- Mary Lloyd Tayler (1859–1951) married James Caldwell Anderson on 3 January 1883. Anderson, a barrister, was a son of Robert Stirling Hore Anderson, M.L.C.
- W. Northcote Lloyd-Tayler (1861 – 29 June 1919) was an architect in the Colonial Architect's Office, Coolgardie, Western Australia. He died at Blackheath, New South Wales.
- Emily Elizabeth Lloyd Tayler (9 August 1864 – 26 November 1948) married Percy Dobson on 1 July 1885. Emily married again, to Dr Charles Fitzmaurice Harkin (died 25 September 1950) on 23 June 1896.
- daughter 24 November 1868
- daughter 25 November 1873

== Selected works ==
- St Mary's Church of England (1860) – Hotham
- St Philip's (1865) – Collingwood
- Presbyterian Church (1865) – Punt Road, South Yarra
- Trinity Church (1869) – Bacchus Marsh
- Kamesburgh (1872) – 74–104 North Road, Brighton; for W. K. Thomson
- Chevy Chase (1881) – 203 Were Street, Brighton; for John Binnie;
- Portland House (1872) –
- Bank of Australasia (1876) –
- Australian Club (1879) –
- Mynda – 5 Molesworth Street, Kew; for his son-in-law, J. C. Anderson
- Thyra (1883) – Wilson Street, Middle Brighton; for J. W. Shevill? but later home of William Addison Adamson MLC
- St Andrew's Church, Brighton (1886) – enlarged
- Commercial Bank of Australia Limited (1891–1893) – Collins Street, Melbourne; with Alfred Dunn
- Eastern Hill Fire Station (1892) – Melbourne
- Leighswood – Toorak; for Charles E. Bright
- Rosecraddock – Hawthorn Road, Caulfield; for Charles Pettey Langdon
- Blair Athol – Brighton Beach; for shipowner Archibald Currie
- Kilwinning – Balaclava Road, East St Kilda; for James Service
