= Joseph Nichols =

New Zealand cricketer (1859–1954)

Joseph Nichols CBE VD
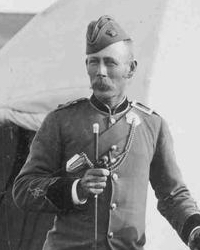
- Nichols pictured in military uniform during the 1890s

Personal information
- Full name: Joseph Cowie Nichols (Note: Nichols' surname is spelled Nicholls by cricket sources, but Nichols in all other contexts.)
- Born: 14 April 1859; Launceston, Colony of Tasmania
- Died: 27 July 1954 (aged 95); Kuriheka, Maheno, New Zealand

Domestic team information
- Years: Team
- 1876/77: Otago
- Source: ESPNcricinfo, 19 May 2016

Joseph Cowie Nichols CBE VD (14 April 1859 – 27 July 1954) was a New Zealand soldier, landowner and cricketer. He played one first-class match for Otago during the 1876–77 season.

== Early life ==
Nichols was born at Launceston in what was then the Colony of Tasmania in 1859, the son of Charles and Mary (née Cowie) Nichols. His maternal grandfather, Robert Cowie, owned the Brookstead Estate on the island and Joseph's father was a merchant for Dalgety & Company and was transferred to New Zealand in 1869, becoming a partner in Dalgety, Nichols and Co at Dunedin. Joseph was educated at Otago Boys' High School in the city and at Christ's College in Christchurch. He played cricket for Otago during this period of his life, making his only first-class appearance for the team against Canterbury in January 1877, scoring a total of four runs in the match. He played in a team of 18 against the touring English team led by James Lillywhite later in the season and in a team of 22 against the touring Australians the following season.

Nichols' father died in 1878 and his mother took the family―Nichols was one of eight children (Note: Three of his brothers, Charles, Cyril and Walter, were also educated at Cambridge University.)―to Europe, with Joseph taking up a place at Jesus College, Cambridge in October 1879.

== Life at Kuriheka ==
After Cambridge, Nichols visited Egypt and India on the way to Australia where he arrived in 1882. He worked as a sheep farmer on a station at Riverina owned by the Ayre family in New South Wales. He moved back to New Zealand in 1885 when he purchased Kuriheka Station at Maheno in North Otago. He married Helen Hunter Ayre, the daughter of the farmer he had worked for in Australia, in 1890; the couple had six children, four sons and two daughters. (Note: Two of their sons were killed on active service in Europe during World War I along with Nichols' brother Walter.) Nichols developed the estate at Kuriheka over the following 40 years.

== Military career ==
In 1886 Nichols joined the Otago Hussars and was commissioned as a lieutenant in the North Otago Hussars the following year. He was promoted to captain in 1897 and in 1901 to major, commanding the 1st regiment of the Otago Mounted Rifles Brigade. He was promoted to lieutenant-colonel in 1902 and to colonel, commanding the brigade, in 1907. He served as aide-de-camp to the Governor General of New Zealand in 1913 and during World War I he commanded the Otago Military District. He was appointed a Commander of the British Empire in the 1918 New Zealand War Honours. He was also awarded the Colonial Auxiliary Forces Officers' Decoration.

== Later life ==
Nichols remained living at Kuriheka for the rest of his life. He died at the property in 1954 at the age of 95.
