= Thyra Bethell =

New Zealand Red Cross organizer and women's community leader

Thyra Talvase Bethell MBE (née Beetham, 5 December 1882 – 16 November 1972) was a New Zealand Red Cross organizer and women's community leader. She was born at Brancepeth Station, Wairarapa, New Zealand, on 5 December 1882.

In 1918, Bethell was appointed a Member of the Order of the British Empire, for services in connection with the New Zealand branch of the British Red Cross Society and Order of St John. In 1953, she was awarded the Queen Elizabeth II Coronation Medal.
