= List of high commissioners of New Zealand to Papua New Guinea =

The high commissioner of New Zealand to Papua New Guinea is New Zealand's foremost diplomatic representative in the Independent State of Papua New Guinea, and in charge of New Zealand's diplomatic mission in Papua New Guinea.

The high commission is located in Port Moresby, Papua New Guinea's capital city. New Zealand has maintained a resident high commissioner in Papua New Guinea since Papua New Guinea's independence in 1975, and a resident Head of Mission since 1974.

As fellow members of the Commonwealth of Nations, diplomatic relations between New Zealand and Papua New Guinea are at governmental level, rather than between heads of state. Thus, the countries exchange high commissioners, rather than ambassadors.

== List of heads of mission ==
=== Commissioners to Papua New Guinea ===
- Brian Poananga (1974–1975)

=== High commissioners to Papua New Guinea ===
- Brian Poananga (1975–1976)
- Michael Mansfield (1976–1979)
- Alison Stokes (1979–1982)
- Tim Hannah (1982–1985)
- Gerald McGhie (1985–1988)
- Hilary Willberg (1988–1989)
- John Hayes (1989–1993)
- Maarten Wevers (1993–1994)
- John Clarke (1994–1997)
- Nigel Moore (1997–2001)
- Chris Seed (2001–2003)
- Laurie Markes (2003–2006)
- Niels Holm (2007–2010)
- Marion Cranshaw (2010–2014)
- Tony Fautua (2014–2017)
- Sue Mackwell (2017–2019)
- Phillip Taula (2019–2023)
- Peter Zwart (2023–2026)
- Georgina Roberts (2026–)
