= Richmond Beetham =

New Zealand artist and magistrate

- Born: 1832; Horncastle, England
- Died: 1912 (aged 79–80); Masterton, New Zealand
- Known for: Oil paintings
- Spouses: Lucelle Frances Swainson (m. 1863; died 1910) Helen Hampton (m. 1910–1912)

Richmond Beetham (1832–1912) was a British-born painter and magistrate. He spent most of his life living in New Zealand.

== Early life ==
Richmond Beetham was born in 1832 in Horncastle, England. He was the eldest son of Mary Beetham (née Brosley) and the portrait painter William Beetham. He attended the Elizabethan Foundation School. In the mid-1850s, he moved to Victoria, before moving to Wellington, New Zealand in 1859, where his parents had also moved.

== Life in New Zealand ==
In 1862, he attained his first job as a public servant, working as a Receiver of Land Revenue in the Otago goldfields. In 1863 he married Lucelle Frances Swainson, the daughter of naturalist and artist William Swainson. That same year, he was appointed as a stipendiary magistrate in Queenstown, and later Napier and Timaru. Eventually, he was moved to Christchurch in 1881, where he continued to work until his retirement in May 1903.

== Artist ==
Like his father, Beetham was a painter. Throughout the 1880s and 1890s, he exhibited his works in New Zealand and abroad – including at the 1886 Colonial and Indian Exhibition in London, and the 1889–90 New Zealand and South Seas Exhibition in Dunedin. He also exhibited his works at the Canterbury Society of Arts from 1881 to 1893, where he also served on the committee and as President.

== Later life ==
Beetham later moved to Masterton, where he died in 1912.

== Art works ==
- The Roman Catholic Mission, Apia, Samoa in the collection of Alexander Turnbull Library
