= Constance Abraham =

New Zealand community leader and sportswoman

Constance Palgrave Abraham MBE JP (née Martyn; 12 May 1864 – 3 October 1942) was a New Zealand community leader and sportswoman. She was born in Palgrave, Suffolk, England in 1864. In June 1890 at Long Melford, she married Lionel Abraham from Palmerston North in New Zealand; he had emigrated some time earlier.

== Personal life ==
Abraham was born to Catherine Elizabeth Harrison and Charles John Martyn, who was an honorary royal chaplain. She was heavily involved in the church from a young age.

From 1890, she lived with her husband in their residence Te Ranara Whare, located in Palmerston North. Her husband, Lionel Abraham, was the general merchant of the area. The couple entertained many people at their home, particularly after sporting events. They had seven children together. They practiced Christianity and were Anglicans.

== Community involvement ==
Both Abraham and her husband volunteered at All Saints' Anglican Church in Palmerston North. Abraham raised funds as well as leading and organising the women's and children's groups. The carved pulpit was dedicated to the couple. Abraham also did significant service work during the first world war, being involved in many local committees and raising funds for the war effort.

She helped found Palmerston North's Young Women's Christian Association (YWCA), and served as its first president. She was made a lifetime member in 1930. She founded the Palmerston North branch of the Plunket Society, and served as president before being made a lifetime member in 1925.

Abraham was the only woman on the Palmerston North Hospital Board from 1921 until her 1935 retirement. She worked on the executive committee, and was particularly involved with the children's ward.

== Sport ==
Abraham competed as an equestrian, in tennis and in golf.

She won tennis championships both in England and New Zealand, and was the first champion of Manawatū Ladies' Golf Club in 1902. She served a number of roles in the golf club including president, and was made a lifetime member.

== Recognition ==
Abraham was appointed MBE in October 1918 for her service during the war. In 1932, she was appointed a justice of the peace. She received the King George V Silver Jubilee medal in 1935.
