= Edith Macfarlane =

New Zealand community worker (1871–1948)

Edith Macfarlane OBE
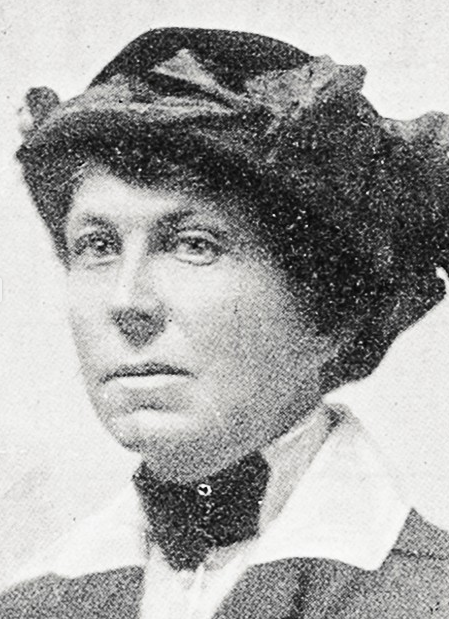
- Macfarlane, from a 1918 newspaper
- Born: Edith Mary Durrieu; 20 May 1871; Torquay, Devon, England
- Died: 2 December 1948 (aged 77); Auckland, New Zealand

Edith Mary Macfarlane OBE (née Durrieu; 20 May 1871 – 2 December 1948) was a New Zealand community worker, active with the British Red Cross Society during both World Wars, and with the Victoria League in Auckland.

== Early life ==
Edith Mary Durrieu was born in Torquay, Devonshire, England, on 20 May 1871, the daughter of accountant Louis Adolphus Durrieu and the former Marianne Feltham. The Durrieu family moved to New Zealand when Edith was a small child. She attended Auckland Girls' High School.

== Community work ==
During World War I, Macfarlane organized the New Zealand Branch of the British Red Cross Society and the Auckland Women's Patriotic League. She also organized a 1917 concert for sailors in Wellington, with the Sailors' Friend Society, and was active in the Women's Patriotic League. Her contributions during the first World War were recognised when she was appointed Officer of the Order of the British Empire in October 1918.

Between the wars she was active with the Auckland branch of the Victoria League. She organized the league's Sewing Circle, and became the branch's president in 1937. She continued in this role until her death a decade later. Under Macfarlane's leadership, the league visited hospitals, held patriotic ceremonies, honored volunteers, and sent parcels of food and clothing to Great Britain, during the Great Depression and World War II.

Macfarlane remained active with the Red Cross Society between the wars. She was also president of the St. James' Free Kindergarten and chair of the ladies auxiliary of the Community Sunshine Association. She visited Alaska and Canada in 1927.

== Personal life ==
Edith Mary Durrieu married Scottish-born businessman James Buchanan Macfarlane in 1890, in Auckland. They had six children together. Their eldest son, James Blyth Macfarlane, was wounded at Gallipoli in 1915. Their Epsom home on Gillies Avenue was used for social gatherings, and known for its extravagant wisteria plant. She was widowed in 1939 and died at home in 1948, aged 77 years. She left £100 to the Victoria League of Auckland in her will.
