= Joshua Charlesworth =

New Zealand architect

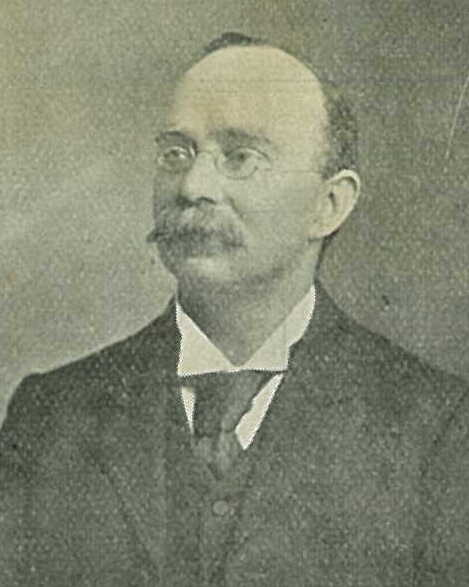

Joshua Charlesworth (1860–1925) was a New Zealand architect who specialised in neo-classical architecture. Charlesworth trained as an architect in Yorkshire before immigrating to New Zealand at 19 years of age. Despite being recognised for his talent and winning several design competitions he initially struggled to gain employment due to his young age and lack of experience. Charlesworth's most notable works are the Wellington Town Hall and the several Bank of New Zealand buildings he designed. Many of Charlesworth's surviving works are registered with Heritage New Zealand.

== Early life ==
Joshua Charlesworth was born in Dewsbury, Yorkshire, England, in 1860. Charlesworth apprenticed to Stead Ellis, based in Batley, with whom he emigrated to New Zealand with aboard the Euterpe in 1879. Aboard the Euterpe Ellis produced the Euterpe Times and Charlesworth wrote the paper in longhand. The pair arrived in Lyttelton, New Zealand 24 December 1879 and swiftly parted ways. (Note: The decision to split was amicable and Charlesworth had great respect for Ellis, as evidenced by naming his eldest son after him.)

== Architectural career ==
Charlesworth moved to Timaru where he worked as a draughtsman for Frank Wilson (father of Gordon Wilson. The 1885–1886 edition of Wise's Directory Charlesworth was recorded as being based in Queen Street, Auckland and in the subsequent edition he was listed as being in Devonport. Charlesworth struggled to gain architectural employment in Auckland mainly working as a draughtsman for other architects, this was despite his talent and strong placements in design competitions.

Charlesworth won a design competition in 1886 for the Government Insurance building. Thomas Turnbull placed second but refused to accept the prize money and Charlesworth was given the prizes for both first and second place. Due to his inexperience he agreed to work with Christian Toxward in the erection of his design — Charlesworth was humbled to work with Toxward. (Note: Charlesworth said of working with Toxward: 'From what I saw, and afterwards heard of Mr. Toxward, I consider myself fortunate to be able to make arrangements with him to carry out the building jointly, as it is well known that in experience and knowledge of his profession he is second to none in the colony.') Despite an endorsement from Edward Mahoney, after Toxward died the project was handed to Clere, Fitzgerald, and Richmond, who changed the design. Charlesworth sued the government over the issue.

By 1890 Charlesworth was not listed in New Zealand; he had left for Australia in 1888 due to lack of available work arising from the Long Depression. Tender notices show Charlesworth working with Frank Wilson in Melbourne.

In April 1894 Charlesworth had moved to Wellington but picked up little work for the first 3 years. In 1897 he won a design competition for the Nelson Town Hall but the Nelson City Council was unable to afford the design and it was ultimately built to a different design. Charlesworth designed over 50 buildings in Wellington, including the Wellington Town Hall. Charlesworth also designed buildings in Nelson and Whanganui during this period. Charlesworth was the architect for the Bank of New Zealand and designed over 17 buildings for the bank.

Charlesworth preferred the neo-classical style for his designs and his works such as the Wellington Town Hall and his Bank of New Zealand buildings used the style, although it is not known how he learnt to design structures in the classical style: Dewsbury and Batley were lacking in classical architecture and Stead Ellis did not use the style for his buildings. Charlesworth's diary describes All Saint's Church, Poplar as 'a fine building of Corinthian order in the style of St Pauls'.

Charlesworth was made a fellow of the New Zealand Institute of Architects in 1905. He served as vice president of the New Zealand Institute of Architects from 1909 to 1910 before resigning from the organisation over a dispute about pricing policy. Charlesworth became chairman of the rival Society of Architects until it was dissolved in 1913 after the issue with pricing in the NZIA had been resolved and its members rejoined the NZIA.

In 1925 Charlesworth died at his Wallaceville property.

== Personal life ==
Charlesworth married Ellen Hallam, whom he met aboard the Euterpe, in May 1882 at St Mary's Church, Timaru. Charlesworth's eldest son, Ellis Hallam trained under his father and worked as an architect for the Wellington City Council for 14 years.

Charlesworth was the founder and president of Wellington's Yorkshire Society.

== List of works ==
| Name | Date | Image | Note | Ref |
|---|---|---|---|---|
| Home for the Aged Needy | 1887 | | Charlesworth won a design competition for the building. Demolished | |
| Farmers Building, Masterton | 1892 | | Scheduled with the Masterton District Council | |
| Australian Club (Melbourne) | 1893 | | Designed an extension of an existing building. Scheduled with the Victorian Heritage Register | |
| St Barnabas Church, Roseneath | 1899 | | Altered in 1924 by Frederick de Jersey Clere after severe damage from a fire. Registered as a category 2 building with Heritage New Zealand | |
| Wellington Town Hall | 1901 | | Won a design competition for the town hall. Registered as a category 1 building with Heritage New Zealand | |
| Oxley's Hotel | 1902 | | Registered as a category 2 building with Heritage New Zealand. Only the facade remains and some ornate detailing has been lost | |
| Homewood | 1903 | | Significantly enlarged and altered an existing building. Registered as a category 1 building with Heritage New Zealand | |
| Chief Post Office, Palmerston North | 1905 | | Clocktower, pediments, and parapet removed. Registered as a category 2 building with Heritage New Zealand | |
| Brancepeth Station | 1905 | | Significantly enlarged and altered an existing building. Registered as a category 1 building with Heritage New Zealand | |
| 10 Patrick Street ('Domus') | 1906 | | Registered as a category 2 building with Heritage New Zealand | |
| Seven Sisters of Oriental Bay | 1906 | | Scheduled with the Wellington City Council and registered with Heritage New Zealand as part of the Oriental Parade Historic Area | |
| Bank of New Zealand, Feilding | 1906 | | Demolished in 1963 | |
| Bank of New Zealand, Marton | 1906 | | Registered as a category 2 building with Heritage New Zealand | |
| Bank of New Zealand, Whanganui | 1906 | | Registered as a category 2 building with Heritage New Zealand | |
| Court of Appeal Building | 1907 | | Only facade remains. Scheduled with the Wellington City Council | |
| Te Aro Post Office | 1908 | | Demolished 1977 | |
| Bank of New Zealand, Rongotea | 1908 | | Scheduled with the Manawatu District Council | |
| Homewood Croquet Pavilion | 1908 | | Registered as a category 1 building with Heritage New Zealand | |
| St Hilda's Church, Upper Hutt | 1909 | | | |
| 186 Oriental Parade | 1909 | | Scheduled with the Wellington City Council | |
| Bank of New Zealand, Martinborough | 1909 | | Registered as a category 2 building with Heritage New Zealand | |
| Bank of New Zealand, Ohakune | c.1910 | | Extant but building but facade has been removed and building substantially altered to the point of not being recognisable | |
| Pongaroa Hotel | 1911 | | Originally the Bank of New Zealand, Pongaroa | |
| Bank of New Zealand, Raetihi | 1911 | | Registered as a category 2 building with Heritage New Zealand | |
| Bank of New Zealand, Masterton | 1913 | | Demolished in 1942 | |
| Farmers Building | 1914 | | Registered as a category 2 building with Heritage New Zealand and part of the Cuba Street Historic Area | |
| Bank of New Zealand, Takaka | 1914 | | Registered as a category 1 building with Heritage New Zealand | |
| Bank of New Zealand, Dannevirke | 1915 | | Parapet and other detailings removed at some point. Registered as a category 1 building with Heritage New Zealand | |
| Bank of New Zealand, Greytown | n.d. | | Registered as a category 2 building with Heritage New Zealand. Possibly designed by Charlesworth | |
| Bank of New Zealand, Mangaweka | n.d. | | | |
| Bank of New Zealand, Westport | n.d. | | | |
| Bank of New Zealand, Shannon | 1914 | | Attributed to Charlesworth by one source but to Crichton & McKay by Heritage New Zealand | |
| Bank of New Zealand, Featherston | n.d. | | | |
