= Lydia Wevers =

New Zealand literary historian and critic (1950–2021)

Lydia Wevers ONZM
- Born: Lydia Joyce Wevers; 19 March 1950; Hengelo, Netherlands
- Died: 4 September 2021 (aged 71); Wellington, New Zealand
- Title: Emeritus professor
- Spouse: Alastair Bisley
- Children: 3
- Relatives: Maarten Wevers (brother)
- Awards: Pou Aronui Award from the Royal Society Te Apārangi

Academic background
- Education: Victoria University of Wellington
- Thesis: A History of the Short Story in New Zealand (1990)

Academic work
- Discipline: Literary criticism Literary history
- Institutions: Victoria University of Wellington
- Notable students: Anne Kennedy

Lydia Joyce Wevers ONZM (19 March 1950 – 4 September 2021) was a New Zealand literary historian, literary critic, editor, and book reviewer. She was an academic at Victoria University of Wellington for many years, including acting as director of the Stout Research Centre for New Zealand Studies from 2001 to 2017. Her academic research focussed on New Zealand literature and print culture, as well as Australian literature. She wrote three books, Country of Writing: Travel Writing About New Zealand 1809–1900 (2002), On Reading (2004) and Reading on the Farm: Victorian Fiction and the Colonial World (2010), and edited a number of anthologies.

== Early life and family ==
Wevers was born in Hengelo, Netherlands, on 19 March 1950, to Mattheus and Joyce Wevers. Her father was an architect and she had four brothers, including diplomat Maarten Wevers. The family moved to New Zealand in 1953, and Wevers became a naturalised New Zealander the following year. She grew up in Masterton and developed a love of reading as a child, saying in later life: "When I was a child, there had to be a special rule for me at Masterton public library that said I could borrow 12 books at a time instead of the usual two". She attended St Matthew's Collegiate School, where she was head girl and dux. She was the only student in her school year to attend university.

Wevers lived in Wellington, and was married to public servant and diplomat Alastair Bisley. They had two sons and a daughter. In the 2017 New Year Honours, he was appointed a Companion of the Queen's Service Order, for services to the State. She died at home on 4 September 2021, and was buried at Mākara Cemetery.

== Early career ==
She obtained an undergraduate degree from Victoria University of Wellington, followed by a MPhil at St Anne's College, Oxford on a two-year Commonwealth Scholarship. On returning to New Zealand in 1973 she became a lecturer in Renaissance literature at Victoria University of Wellington, and subsequently developed expertise in New Zealand literature. Her doctoral thesis, completed in 1990, is on the history of the short story in New Zealand. In 1988 she edited Yellow Pencils: Contemporary Poetry by New Zealand Women, which was one of the earliest anthologies of New Zealand's women's verse. Compared to a 1977 anthology edited by Riemke Ensing, it was described by The Oxford Companion to New Zealand Literature as having a "better range of theme, consistency of achievement, and more generous space".

During her early career, Wevers spent periods living in Australia and working at the University of New South Wales and the University of Sydney where she developed an interest in Australian literature. In the early 1980s she met Australian scholar Elizabeth Webby and became involved with the Association for the Study of Australian Literature (ASAL). Together with Webby, she edited the first two anthologies of stories by Australian and New Zealand women writers: Happy Endings: Stories by Australian and New Zealand Women, 1850s–1930s (1987) and Goodbye to Romance: Stories by Australian and New Zealand Women 1930s–1980s (1989). In 2008 she presented the Dorothy Green Memorial Lecture for an ASAL conference, titled The View From Here: Readers and Australian literature. In the opening, she joked: "I am a New Zealand reader of Australian literature. That makes me just about a category of one. The reverse category, an Australian reader of New Zealand literature, is also a rare beast, though perhaps there is a breeding pair in existence." In 2012 she organised and ran an ASAL conference in Wellington, which was the first and only ASAL conference held outside of Australia.

Her chapter "The Short Story" in The Oxford History of New Zealand Literature in English (1991, edited by Terry Sturm) was the first academic discussion of the history of New Zealand short stories. It followed her doctoral thesis, A History of the Short Story in New Zealand (1990).

== Later career ==
From 1998 to 2001 she was appointed as a senior research associate at Victoria University, and the principal researcher for a project on the history of print culture. That research led to her historical work Country of Writing: Travel Writing About New Zealand 1809–1900 (2002) and a companion anthology Travelling to New Zealand: An Oxford Anthology (2000). In 2002 she founded the Journal of New Zealand Studies, a peer-reviewed multidisciplinary journal for articles with a focus on New Zealand. In 2004 her essay work On Reading, commissioned by Lloyd Jones, was published as part of the Montana Estates essay series. She opened the essay by saying:

I suffer from an illness, an illness which has no cure, no limit and no end. It’s compulsive, expensive, consuming and addictive, it fills my house and my life and my time – I refer of course to reading.

She assisted with Te Ara: The Encyclopedia of New Zealand from its inception in 2005, including writing the section on Fiction. In 2010, she published Reading on the Farm: Victorian Fiction and the Colonial World, an exploration of the history of the 2000-volume Victorian library at Brancepeth Station. John McCrystal in a review for The New Zealand Herald described the book as a "little gem of a social history", in which Wevers did "a wonderful job of evoking the world of those who lived and worked at Brancepeth at the end of the 19th century".

She was the director of the Stout Research Centre for New Zealand Studies at Victoria University from 2001 to 2017. At the time Wevers was appointed a part-time director, the university had been considering the centre's closure, and it was through her efforts that the centre became an integral part of the university with additional staff members, connections with other research institutes and a broad scope of research into New Zealand society, history and culture. In this role she mentored a number of young female and Māori academics, and had a particular role in supporting the centre's Treaty of Waitangi Research Unit. After her retirement in 2017 she was appointed an emeritus professor and continued to be involved with a number of university projects and teaching work. Together with Charlotte Macdonald she hosted a popular series of "Butcher Shop" lectures in 2017, exploring New Zealand's primary industries such as meat and dairy products. In the same year, she and Maria Bargh released New Zealand Landscape as Culture, an open-access online course on the edX platform featuring mātauranga Māori concepts, which has been described as New Zealand's first bicultural massive open online course. In September 2020 she spoke out about division in the university "brought to a head partly by Covid, and partly by this increasing and demonstrable sense the staff have that they don’t trust the senior leadership".

Wevers was a former vice-president of the New Zealand Book Council, chair of the Writers and Readers Committee of the New Zealand Festival of the Arts, and chair of the Board of Trustees of Wellington College. She was the Chair of the Trustees of the National Library of New Zealand and in 2003 became the inaugural Chair of the Kaitiaki Guardians of the National Library. On 28 June 2018 she delivered the Founder Lecture at the launch of the National Library's centenary celebrations on the subject of the library's history and the book collector Alexander Turnbull. She was a member of the selection panel for the Arts Foundation of New Zealand Laureate Awards in 2001, a member of the Marsden Fund Council of the Royal Society Te Apārangi, a member of the Arts Board of Creative New Zealand, a member of the selection panel for the Prime Minister's Awards for Literary Achievement in 2019, and a board member of Aratoi, Wairarapa Museum of Art and History, for eight years. She reviewed books for Nine to Noon on Radio New Zealand and The New Zealand Listener, as well as for a number of other magazines, newspapers and literary journals.

== Awards and legacy ==
Wevers was appointed an Officer of the New Zealand Order of Merit for services to literature in the 2006 Queen's Birthday Honours. She was an Honorary Life Member of the Association for the Study of Australian Literature and a Fellow of the Stockholm Collegium of World Literary History. In 2010 she was a Fulbright Visiting Scholar at Georgetown University in Washington DC, where she researched the relationship between New Zealand and American literature, and ran a course on modern New Zealand literature.

In 2014, the Royal Society Te Apārangi presented Wevers with the Pou Aronui Award for distinguished service to the humanities. The selection panel described her as a "tireless and effective champion of New Zealand's literature, history, thought and culture". In 2017 she was a 150 women in 150 words laureate of the Royal Society Te Apārangi.

From April to June 2022, Victoria University hosted a series of seminars in honour of Wevers. The focus of the seminars was reading in New Zealand, and speakers included Ingrid Horrocks, Tina Makereti, Anna Fifield, Kate De Goldi, Dougal McNeill, Fergus Barrowman, and a range of other writers and literary experts. On the final night of the series, an NZ$33,000 scholarship in Wevers' name was announced, which will be awarded annually to a postgraduate student carrying out research about New Zealand.

== Selected works ==
- 1984 Selected poems/Robin Hyde (editor)
- 1984 Classics New Zealand Short Stories (editor, fourth edition)
- 1985 Women's Work: Contemporary Short Stories by New Zealand Women, also published as One Whale, Singing; And Other Stories from New Zealand (1986) (editor, with Marion McLeod)
- 1987 Happy Endings: Stories by Australian and New Zealand Women, 1850s–1930s (editor, with Elizabeth Webby)
- 1988 Yellow Pencils: Contemporary Poetry by New Zealand Women (editor)
- 1989 Goodbye to Romance: Stories by Australian and New Zealand Women 1930s–1980s (editor, with Elizabeth Webby)
- 1990 Tabasco Sauce and Ice Cream: Stories by New Zealanders (editor)
- 2000 Travelling to New Zealand: An Oxford Anthology (editor)
- 2002 Country of Writing: Travel Writing About New Zealand 1809–1900 (author)
- 2004 On Reading (author)
- 2010 Reading on the Farm: Victorian Fiction and the Colonial World (author)

== See also ==
- New Zealand literature
