= Sydney Snow =

Australian businessman and political figure

Sir Sydney Snow KBE
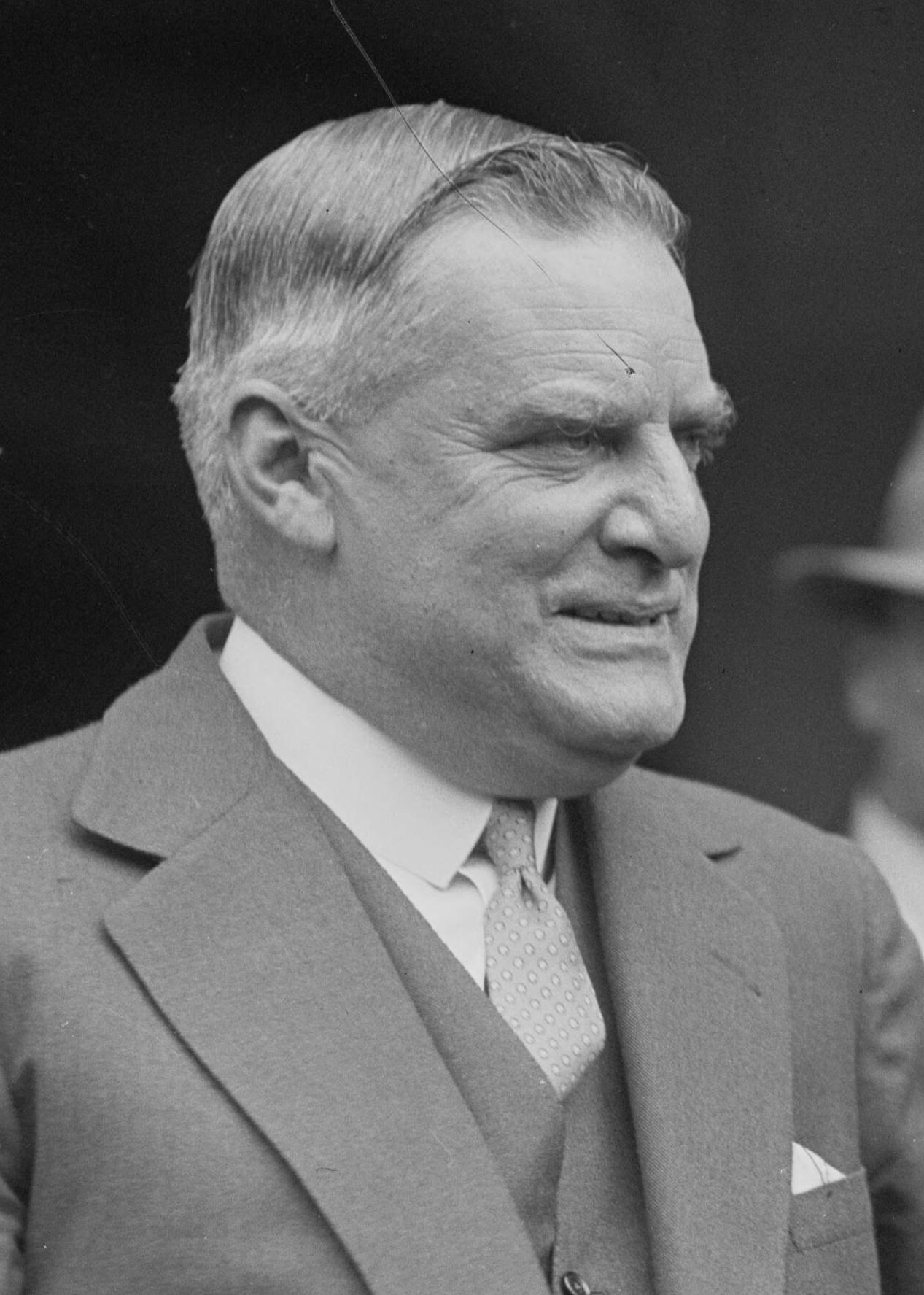
- Born: 17 December 1887; Ballarat, Victoria, Australia
- Died: 24 November 1958 (aged 70); Paddington, New South Wales, Australia
- Education: Ballarat College
- Spouse: Ruby Davies (m. 1913)
- Relatives: Kenneth Asprey (son-in-law)

Sir Sydney Snow KBE (17 December 1887 – 24 November 1958) was an Australian businessman and political figure. His obituary in The Canberra Times described him as "one of Australia's greatest political, business and sporting figures".

== Early life ==
Snow was born in Ballarat, Victoria, to Emily (née Piper) and John Snow. He was educated at Ballarat College. His father ran John Snow & Co., a drapery emporium, while his brother Sir Gordon Snow ran Snows Men's Wear.

== Business career ==
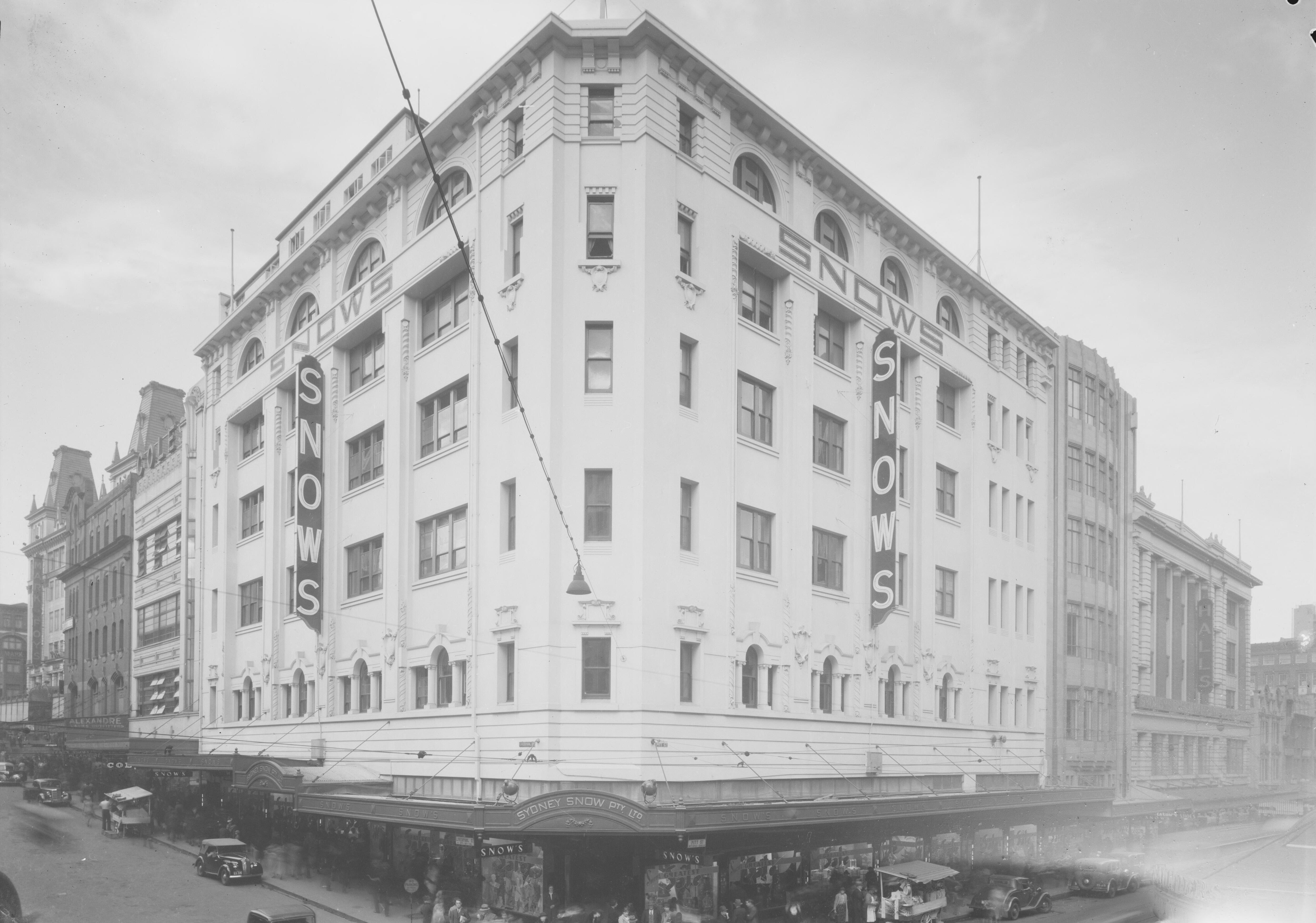
Snow's Emporium in 1939

In 1912, Snow moved to Sydney and established Sydney Snow Limited with the help of his father and a business partner William Vaughan Manton (who would go onto establish Manton & Sons in Melbourne). He opened Snow's Emporium, a softgoods store on the corner of Pitt Street and Liverpool Street, opposite the Anthony Hordern & Sons department store. His business grew and flourished, surviving both world wars, the Great Depression, and increased competition from smaller retailers. He eventually opened a second store in Camperdown in 1951, but retired in 1954 and sold the company to Cox Bros (Australia) Limited for over £1,250,000 (equivalent to $49,000,000 in 2022). It was reportedly "one of the biggest cash deals in Australian history".

Snow developed wide commercial interests. In the 1920s, he was a director of Yellow Cabs of Australia Limited and Sun Newspapers Limited; he was later deputy chairman of Associated Newspapers Limited after it acquired the latter in 1929. In the 1930s he served on the boards of Broken Hill South Limited, General Industries Limited, H. B. Dickie Limited, the Colonial Mutual Life Assurance Company, and Commonwealth Industrial Gases Limited. He became president of the Retail Traders' Association of New South Wales in 1937.

== Politics and public service ==
During the Great Depression, Snow helped establish the All for Australia League and was a member of its provisional executive, elected in January 1931. In October, Smith's Weekly reported that he had lent the league £1,000 to pay its debts, but in exchange demanded that the league unite with the Nationalist Party. Previously the league had opposed a merger. The two organisations co-operated at the 1931 federal election and subsequently merged into the New South Wales branch of the United Australia Party (UAP) in early 1932. He was initially deputy state president of the UAP, and later chairman of its executive and council until his retirement in 1942. During World War II he served on the State Recruiting Committee. He donated his mansion "Bonnie Brae" in Wahroonga to the Red Cross for use as a convalescent home for soldiers.

== Personal life ==
Snow married Ruby Dent Davies in Ballarat in 1913, with whom he had three children. His daughter Mary married Kenneth Asprey.

Snow was appointed Knight Commander of the Order of the British Empire (KBE) in 1936. He was a co-owner of Peshawar, the racehorse that won the 1953 Caulfield Cup.
