= John Hayes (New Zealand politician) =

New Zealand politician and diplomat

John Hayes ONZM
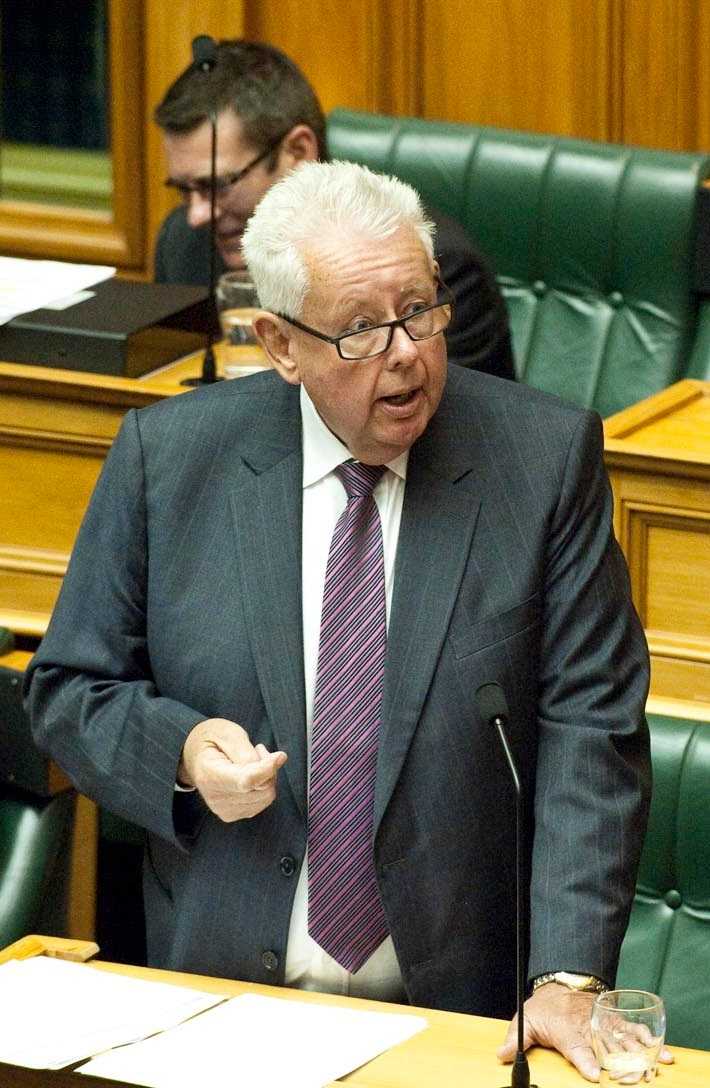
- John Hayes in 2013

Member of the New Zealand Parliament for Wairarapa
- In office 17 September 2005 – 14 August 2014
- Preceded by: Georgina Beyer
- Succeeded by: Alastair Scott

Personal details
- Born: John Bernard Hayes; 15 March 1948 (age 78)
- Party: National

John Bernard Hayes ONZM (born 15 March 1948) is a former New Zealand politician and diplomat. A member of the National Party, he was a Member of the New Zealand House of Representatives in the Wairarapa electorate from 2005 to 2014.

== Early life and family ==
Hayes received his secondary education at Rongotai College and holds a bachelor's degree in agricultural science from Lincoln College. He took part in student politics and was president of the Lincoln College Students' Association in 1970.

Hayes and his wife Helen have two adult children.

== Diplomatic career ==
After a period working as an economist, Hayes joined the New Zealand Ministry of Foreign Affairs and Trade. He held several overseas postings, including in Singapore, India, Bahrain, and Saudi Arabia (as chargé d'affaires). He was the principal private secretary to trade minister Mike Moore in the 1980s before being appointed New Zealand's high commissioner to Papua New Guinea from 1989 to 1993 and ambassador to Iran from 1993 to 1995. Later, he headed the South Pacific division of the ministry.

Hayes took an active role alongside the then Minister of Foreign Affairs and Trade, Don McKinnon, during the Bougainville conflict in the 1990s. In 1997, he returned to Port Moresby to negotiate peace talks between the Papua New Guinea government and the Bougainville Revolutionary Army (the BRA). One such meeting saw the BRA shooting down Hayes' helicopter. In the 1999 Queen's Birthday Honours, Hayes was appointed an Officer of the New Zealand Order of Merit, for services to the Bougainville peace process.

He retired from the foreign ministry in November 2003 and settled in Greytown, where he maintained an apple orchard and worked as a property developer.

== Political career ==
New Zealand Parliament
Years	Term	Electorate	List	Party
2005–2008	48th	Wairarapa	50	National
2008–2011	49th	Wairarapa	50	National
2011–2014	50th	Wairarapa	51	National

In October 2004, Hayes was selected as the new National Party candidate in the Waiarapa electorate for the 2005 general election. He was placed at 50 on the National Party's list and won the electorate with a 2,752-vote majority over Labour candidate Denise McKenzie. Hayes won re-election in Wairarapa at the 2008 and 2011 general elections.

Hayes had a focus on foreign affairs during his tenure as a member of Parliament. From 2006 to 2008 he was an associate spokesperson for the National Party on foreign affairs. He was chairperson of the foreign affairs, defence and trade committee from 2008 to 2014 and a parliamentary private secretary to the Minister of Foreign Affairs, Murray McCully, from 2011 to 2014.

Hayes was critical of New Zealand foreign policy, including its spending on foreign aid. In his maiden statement, given on 17 November 2005, Hayes criticised staff growth in the Ministry of Foreign Affairs and aid given to Niue. He was an observer at the Solomon Islands general election in 2006, which resulted in protests, and criticised the government's programme in the Solomons for failing to predict violence. He opposed self-government in Tokelau, Niue and the Cook Islands and called for a "rethink" in New Zealand's constitutional relationship with those nations in a speech to the New Zealand Institute of International Affairs in 2009. In 2010, as chair of the foreign affairs committee, he revitalised calls for a "Pacific parliament," which had been a foreign policy proposal from the 1970s; this led to the first Pacific Parliamentary and Political Leaders Forum with 19 participating nations being held in 2013.

On social issues, Hayes was a conservative. He supported corporal punishment, opposed microchipping of dogs, opposed cannabis reform, supported raising the drinking age to 20, stated that he was "not inclined to agree [that] there is a scientific consensus on climate change" in 2006, and voted against same-sex marriage legislation in 2013.

Hayes retired at the 2014 election after being challenged for the Wairarapa candidacy by Alastair Scott. In August 2016 he announced he would contest the mayoralty in the South Wairarapa district; he placed third in the October 2016 election.

New Zealand Parliament
Preceded by Georgina Beyer	Member of Parliament for Wairarapa; 2005–2014	Succeeded by Alastair Scott
