= Brancepeth Station =

Agricultural station in the Wairarapa, New Zealand

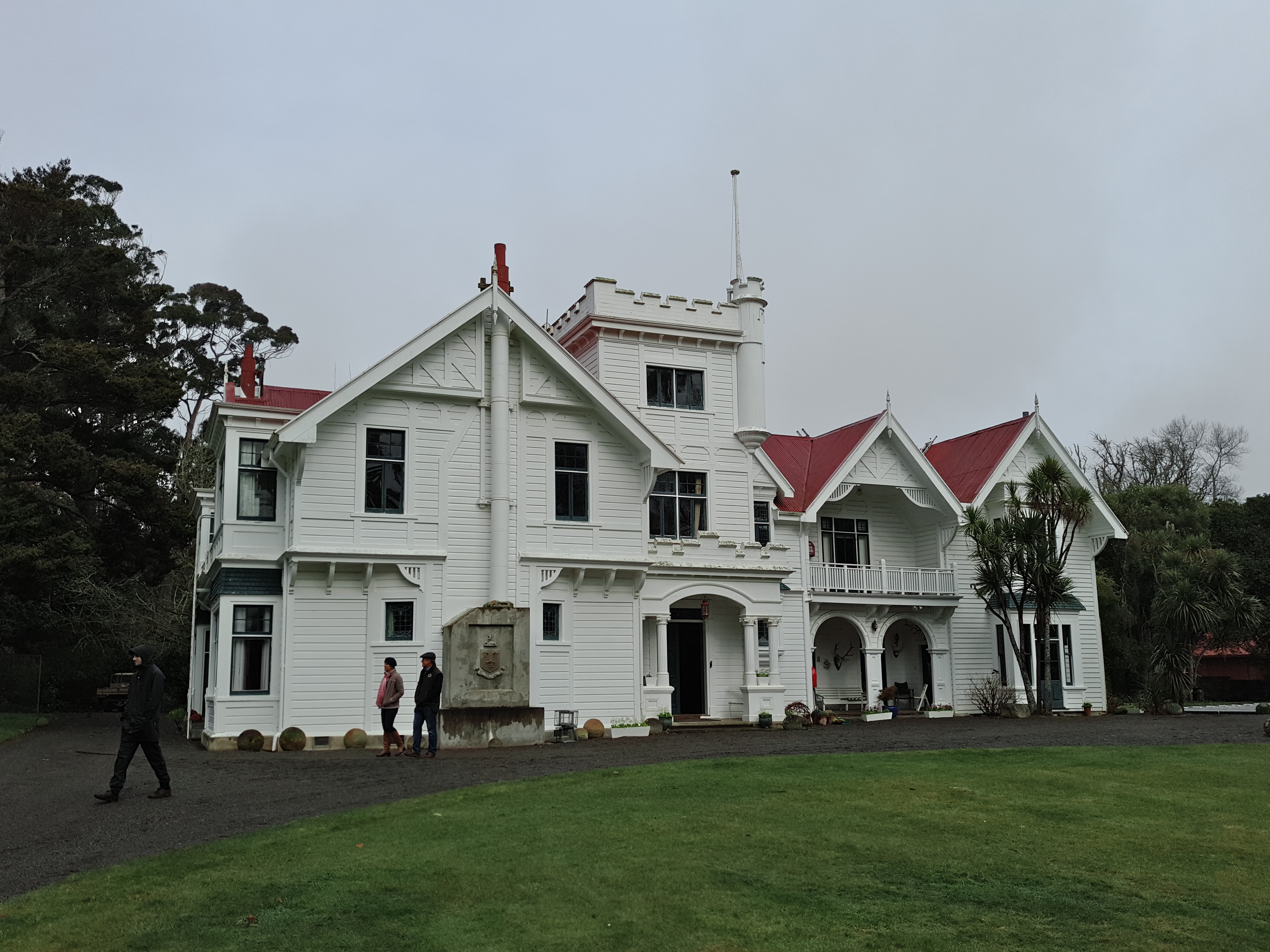
- The exterior of the house at Brancepeth Station

General information
- Location: Masterton Stronvar Road, Wainuioru 5890, Masterton District, Wellington Region, New Zealand
- Coordinates: 41.0468°S 175.8284°E
- Completed: 1859 (homestead)

Design and construction
- Architect: Joshua Charlesworth

Heritage New Zealand – Category 1
- Designated: 24 March 2006
- Reference no.: 7649

Brancepeth Station is a large, historically significant agricultural station in the Wairarapa, New Zealand.

== Description ==
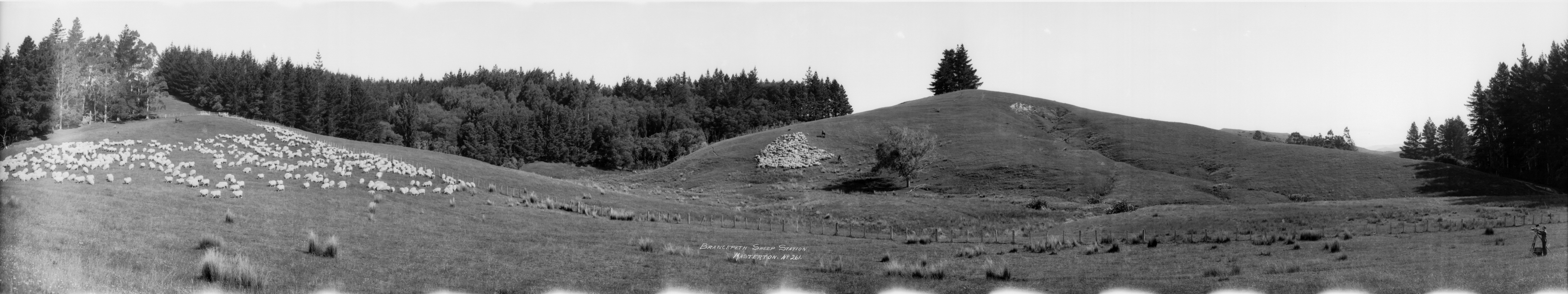
Sheep on Brancepeth Station (around 1923–1928)

The largest building on the property is a 36-room farmhouse. Other buildings still standing include the original whare (built in 1865), the first homestead (1858), a woolshed (1858), a coach house and stables, station school and the library (1884). A historic pātaka (storehouse), Nuku Tewhatewha, which dates from 1856, stood on the property from 1912 until it was moved for preservation to the Dowse Art Museum in Lower Hutt in 1982.

Victoria University of Wellington now holds all the books which were previously in the Brancepeth Library. Professor Lydia Wevers said "Going into the Brancepeth Station Library was like suddenly being in the 19th century, for someone had literally walked out the door 100 years ago and left it there".

Heritage New Zealand has designated Brancepeth as a Category 1 historic place.
