= Macfarlan =

Macfarlan may refer to:

Places:

- Macfarlan, West Virginia, an unincorporated community in West Virginia

People:

- George Macfarlan (1837/38–1868), British-born New Zealand politician
- Ian Macfarlan (1881–1964), Australian politician
- James Macfarlan (1832–1862), Scottish poet
- Robert Macfarlan (Australian judge) (born 1949), Australian judge
- Robert Macfarlan (schoolmaster) (1734–1804), Scottish writer
- Dandridge MacFarlan Cole (1921–1965), American aerospace engineer
- Robert MacFarlan Cole III (1889–1986), American chemical engineer

Other uses:

- Macfarlan Ministry, government of Victoria, Australia, led by Ian Macfarlan
- MacFarlan Smith, Scottish pharmaceutical research company

== See also ==
- McFarlan
- MacFarlane (disambiguation)
- McFarlane (disambiguation)
