= McFarland =

McFarland may refer to:

== People ==
- McFarland (surname)

== Places in the United States ==
- McFarland, California, a city
- McFarland, Kansas, a city
- McFarland, Missouri, a ghost town
- McFarland, Wisconsin, a village

== Other uses ==
- USS McFarland (DD-237), a US Navy destroyer
- McFarland, USA, a 2015 sports drama film
- McFarland & Company, a publisher of nonfiction and academic books
- McFarland Mall, a shopping center in Tuscaloosa, Alabama
- McFarland standards, a scale for the measurement of turbidity in bacterial suspensions
- McFarland incident, a 2000 toxic waste dumping in South Korea
- The McFarlands, an American family YouTube channel

== See also ==
- MacFarland
- McFarlan (disambiguation)
- McFarlane (disambiguation)
- Justice McFarland (disambiguation)
