= MacFarlane (surname) =

MacFarlane or Macfarlane is a surname derived from the Gaelic patronymic Mac Phàrlain (son of Parlan), shared by:

== A ==
- Alan Macfarlane (born 1941), professor of anthropological science at Cambridge University
- Alan Brock MacFarlane (1924–2018), lawyer, judge and political figure in British Columbia
- Alexander Macfarlane (disambiguation) (or Alex or MacFarlane), several people
- Sir Alistair MacFarlane (1931–2021), British electrical engineer
- Allison Macfarlane, chairman of the United States Nuclear Regulatory Commission
- Amy MacFarlane (born 1974), former field hockey forward
- Andrew Macfarlane (died 1819), Anglican clergyman who served as a bishop in the Scottish Episcopal Church
- Angus Macfarlane, New Zealand, schoolteacher and educational psychologist

== B ==
- Bruce MacFarlane, Canadian lawyer, Crown prosecutor, legal scholar, and former federal and provincial Department of Justice official

== C ==
- Catharine Macfarlane (1877–1969), American obstetrician and gynecologist
- Charles Macfarlane (1799–1858), Scottish writer
- Clarence W. Macfarlane (1858–1947), Hawaiian businessman and yachtsman

== D ==
- Danny McFarlane (born 1972), Jamaican hurdler
- Dave MacFarlane (1967–2013), Scottish professional football player who is best known for his time with Kilmarnock
- David Macfarlane (born 1952), Canadian journalist, playwright and novelist
- Donald MacFarlane (1834–1926), Scottish preacher
- Donald Horne Macfarlane (1830–1904)
- Donna MacFarlane (born 1977), Australian middle distance and steeplechase runner
- Dorothy Macfarlane, an English cricketer
- Doug MacFarlane (1880–1965), English professional footballer who played for Barrow, Burnley and Tottenham Hotspur
- Duncan Macfarlane (1827–1903), New Zealand grocer, merchant, government agent, farmer and magistrate

== E ==
- Ed Macfarlane (born 1984), singer, instrumentalist, producer, and the principal songwriter of Friendly Fires
- Edward C. Macfarlane (1848–1902), Hawaiian politician and businessman
- Edith Mary Macfarlane (1871–1948), New Zealand community worker
- Eve MacFarlane, New Zealand rower

== G ==
- Gaynor Macfarlane, radio drama director and producer for BBC Radio Drama at Pacific Quay, Glasgow
- George G. Macfarlane (1916–2007), engineer, scientific administrator and public servant
- George W. Macfarlane (1849–1921), Hawaiian politician, royal chamberlain and businessman
- Gus MacFarlane (1925–1991), Canadian Liberal MP for Hamilton Mountain

== H ==
- Helen Macfarlane, a Scottish Chartist feminist journalist and philosopher

== I ==
- Ian Macfarlane (or MacFarlane), several people

== J ==
- James Macfarlane
- Jean Macfarlane, American psychologist
- John MacFarlane (or John Macfarlane), several people
- Jacobus Carolus Jc MacFarlane, South African Politician and lawyer

== K ==
- Karla MacFarlane, Canadian politician
- Katie MacFarlane (born 1982), former American women's basketball player and a current U.S. Army intelligence officer
- Kee MacFarlane (born 1947), Director of Children's Institute International
- Kris MacFarlane (born 1975), Canadian freelance drummer

== L ==
- Laura MacFarlane, rock and roll musician
- Les MacFarlane (1919–1986), Australian politician
- Lorne MacFarlane (1904–1971), farmer and political figure in Prince Edward Island, Canada
- Luke Macfarlane (born 1980), Canadian actor

== M ==
- Malcolm MacFarlane (1853–1931), Scottish Gaelic scholar and songwriter
- Matt MacFarlane, Canadian politician
- Mike Macfarlane (born 1964), former catcher in Major League Baseball

== N ==
- Neil MacFarlane (footballer) (born 1977), Scottish professional footballer
- Neil Macfarlane (politician) (born 1936), British Conservative politician and former Minister for Sport
- Noel Mason-MacFarlane (1889-1953), Senior British Army officer, administrator and Governor of Gibraltar
- Norman Macfarlane, Baron Macfarlane of Bearsden (1926–2021), British businessman and Conservative member of the House of Lords

== R ==
- Rab Macfarlane (1875–?), Scottish footballer in 1902 Scottish Cup Final
- Rachael MacFarlane (born 1976), voice actress and sister of Seth MacFarlane
- Robert MacFarlane (or Robert Macfarlane), several people
- Ronald D. Macfarlane, distinguished professor of chemistry at Texas A&M University

== S ==
- Sandy MacFarlane (1878–?), Scottish football player and manager
- Scott Macfarlane (journalist), American investigative reporter and congressional correspondent
- Scott Macfarlane (oncologist), New Zealand paediatric oncologist
- Seth MacFarlane (born 1973), American actor, voice actor and animator, best known for his show Family Guy
- Stewart MacFarlane (born 1953), figurative Australian painter

== T ==
- Thomas Macfarlane (1811–1885), 19th-century Member of Parliament from the Auckland Region, New Zealand

== W ==
- Walter Scott MacFarlane (1896–1979), Canadian bard and soldier

== See also ==
- McFarlane (surname)
