= McFarland (surname) =

Origin
- Origin: Scotland
- Region of origin: Northern Ireland

Other names
- Alternative spelling: MacFarlane

McFarland is a variation of the surname MacFarlane; it became popular in northern Ireland, but can be found worldwide. The home of the MacFarlane clan is the parish of Arrochar at the head of Loch Lomond and Loch Long at the beginning of the western Highlands in Scotland. This area was granted by feudal charter to one of the younger sons of the second earl of Lennox in 1286. The history of this exchange is found in an old Celtic genealogy of Duncan, the eighth Earl of Lennox, who was executed in 1425. According to genealogical accounts, the first Earl of Lennox was Alwyn, followed by his son, also named Alwyn, in 1199 as the second Earl. This Alwyn had many sons, the eldest being Maldouen, the third Earl, who granted his younger brother, Gilchrist, the lands of Arrochar. Gilchrist's son Malduin was father to Parlan. In 1344, Parlan's son, Malcolm MacPharlain, renewed the charter for the lands of Arrochar from Donald, the 6th Earl of Lennox. The spelling changed often over many years. The earliest MacFarlanes in northern Ireland appeared in documents as "mcffarlan" but eventually McFarland became a dominant spelling there, and as men moved back and forth between Ireland and Scotland, the use of the "d" appeared in Scotland as well. In early America the spelling could be McFarlin, MacFarland, McFarlan, or McFarling.

- Alan McFarland (born 1949), Northern Ireland Ulster Unionist Party politician and MLA for North Down
- Alexander McFarland (1812–1881), Michigan politician
- Amber McFarland (born 1984), missing person from Canada
- Anne Hazen McFarland (1868–?), American physician, medical journal editor
- Anthony "Booger" McFarland (born 1977), American professional football player
- Anthony McFarland Jr. (born 1999), American football player
- Arthur McFarland (1874–1959), American athlete and coach
- Barrelhouse Buck McFarland (1903–1962), American blues and boogie-woogie pianist
- Billy McFarland, Northern Irish loyalist paramilitary, leading figure in the Ulster Defence Association
- Billy McFarland (fraudster) (born 1991), American tech entrepreneur
- Doug McFarland (born 1946), American politician and professor at Hamline
- Dylan McFarland (born 1980), American professional football player
- Ernest McFarland (1894–1984), American politician; U.S. Senator and Governor of Arizona
- Frank Mace MacFarland (1869–1951), American malacologist
- Gary McFarland (1933–1971), American musician, composer and arranger
- George McFarland (1928–1993), American actor and singer who played "Spanky" in the Our Gang series
- George B. McFarland (1866–1942), Siam-born American physician who pioneered modern medical education in Thailand
- Graeme McFarland (born 1983), American football player, Indiana University
- Hayley McFarland (born 1991), American actress
- Howie McFarland (1910–1993), American baseball player
- Jack McFarland (born 1969), American politician
- James T. McFarland (1930–2015), New York politician
- Jim McFarland (1947–2020), American football player, politician, and lawyer
- John McFarland (disambiguation), several people
- Kathleen Troia McFarland (born 1951), American politician; Assistant Secretary of Defense 1982–1985, Deputy National Security Advisor of Donald Trump
- Matthew W. McFarland, American judge
- Mark McFarland (born 1978), American NASCAR race driver
- Michael C. McFarland (born 1948), American academic; president of the College of the Holy Cross in Worcester, Massachusetts
- Mike McFarland (1970-2026), American actor, comedian, director, and writer
- Packey McFarland (1888–1936), American boxer
- Patrick McFarland (born 1951), American professional basketball player
- Robert McFarland (disambiguation), several people
- Roy McFarland (born 1948), English professional football manager
- Rebecca McFarland, American actress
- Samuel G. McFarland (1830–1897), American missionary active in Siam (Thailand)
- T. J. McFarland (Timothy J. McFarland, born 1989), American baseball pitcher
- Virgie McFarland (1877–1971), Scottish educator and writer
- William McFarland (disambiguation), several people

== Fictional characters ==
- Ambrose McFarland, fictional head of the coal company from the 2000 drama film Songcatcher, played by Steve Boles
- Clementine McFarland, fictional wife of the head of the coal company from the 2000 drama film Songcatcher, played by Rhoda Griffis
- Jack McFarland, fictional character from the sitcom Will & Grace
- Mrs. McFarland, fictional character from the 1989 Christmas film Prancer, played by Cloris Leachman
