= McFarlane (surname) =

McFarlane is a surname. Notable people with the surname include:

== Politics ==
- Allan McFarlane (1792–1864), pastoralist and parliamentarian in South Australia
- Brendan McFarlane (1951–2025), Irish republican activist
- Donald McFarlane, British-American politician
- Duncan McFarlane (1841–1918), New Zealand politician
- Hugh McFarlane (1815–1882), American politician
- Jann McFarlane (born 1944), Australian politician from Stirling, Western Australia
- Jean McFarlane, Baroness McFarlane of Llandaff (1926–2012), British peer; MP from Llandaff
- Norm McFarlane (born 1935 or 1936), Canadian politician; mayor of Saint John, New Brunswick
- Robert McFarlane (American government official) (1937–2022), major figure in the Iran-Contra Affair
- William D. McFarlane (1894–1980), American politician from Texas

== Sport ==
- Bob McFarlane (athlete) (1927–2006), Canadian runner and professional football player
- Calum McFarlane (born 1985), English football manager
- Danny McFarlane (born 1972), Jamaican hurdler in the 2000 and 2004 Olympics
- David McFarlane (footballer) (born 1979), Scottish footballer
- Don McFarlane (athlete, born 1926), Canadian runner in the 1948 Olympics
- Don McFarlane (athlete, born 1931), Canadian runner in the 1952 Olympics
- Mike McFarlane (1960–2023), British sprinter in the 1988 Olympics
- Óscar McFarlane (born 1980), Panamanian football goalkeeper
- Ross McFarlane (footballer) (born 1961), former Scottish football defender
- Ross McFarlane (born 1961), English golfer
- Steve McFarlane, Australian rugby league footballer
- Tom McFarlane (1872–?), Scottish footballer
- Tommy McFarlane, Scottish/American soccer player
- Tracey McFarlane (born 1966), American Olympic swimmer in the 1988 Olympics
- Willie McFarlane (1923–1998), Scottish footballer

== Arts ==
- Andrew McFarlane (born 1951), Australian actor
- Brian McFarlane (born 1934), Australian film historian, writer, and educator
- Colin McFarlane (born 1961), English actor, voice actor and narrator
- Fiona McFarlane (born 1978), Australian author
- Howard McFarlane (1894–1983), English jazz trumpeter
- Leslie McFarlane (1902–1977), Canadian journalist and novelist; ghostwriter of the Hardy Boys series
- Rachel McFarlane, British singer
- Rory McFarlane, British musician
- Shona McFarlane (1929–2001), New Zealand artist, journalist, and broadcaster
- Todd McFarlane (born 1961), Canadian cartoonist, comic book writer, artist, toy manufacturer/designer

== Others ==
- Andrew McFarlane (disambiguation), multiple people
- Brian McFarlane (born 1931), Canadian television sportscaster
- Dijon McFarlane (born 1990), American record producer, known as Mustard
- Ian McFarlane (born 1959), Australian music journalist
- John McFarlane (born 1947), former chief executive of the Australia and New Zealand Banking Group
- K. B. McFarlane (1903–1966), British historian
- Stuart McFarlane (1885–1970), Australian public servant
- William McFarlane (disambiguation), multiple people

== Fictional characters ==
- Kenny McFarlane, character in Marvel Comics Ultimate Universe
- Characters in the BBC soap opera EastEnders
  - Josie McFarlane
  - Kim McFarlane
  - Mick McFarlane (EastEnders)
- Chuck McFarlane, character in Chuck's Choice

== See also ==
- McFarland (disambiguation)
- MacFarland
- McFarlan (disambiguation)
- Macfarlan (disambiguation)
- MacFarlane (disambiguation)
- McFarlane (disambiguation)
