= Iona, Newfoundland and Labrador, Canada =

Iona Rams Islands
- Abandoned Town
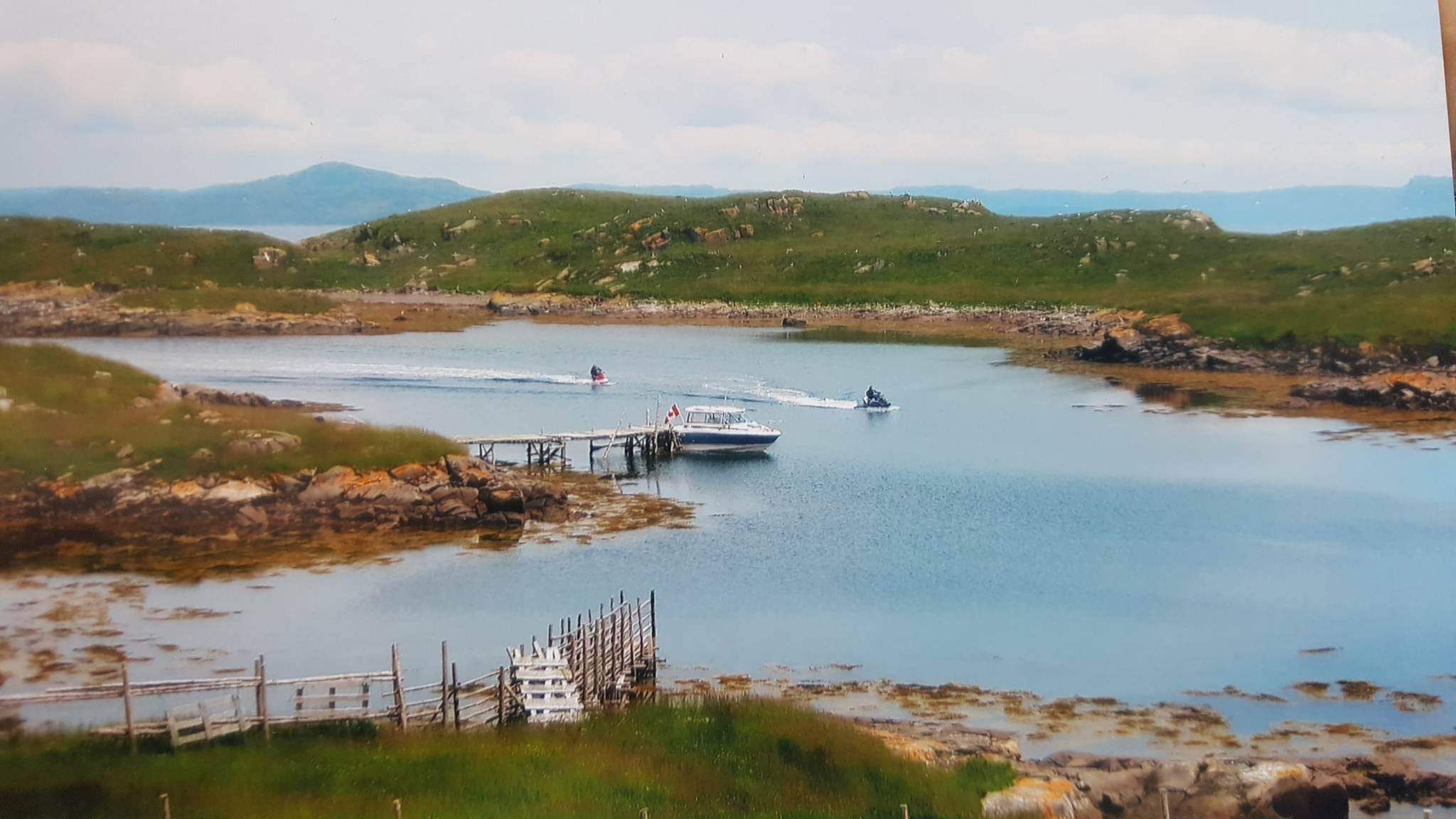
- Iona (Harbour Island), 2012

- Location of Iona in Newfoundland
- Coordinates: 47°25′35.4″N 53°58′22.2″W
- Country: Canada
- Province: Newfoundland and Labrador
- Census division: Division 1
- Census subdivision: Subdivision B

Population (1951)
  - Total: 36
- Time zone: UTC-3:30 (Newfoundland Time)
  - Summer (DST): UTC-2:30 (Newfoundland Daylight)
- Area code: 709
- Bay: Placentia Bay

Iona was a small community in Placentia Bay, Newfoundland and Labrador made up of small islands that used to be inhabited. The islands were once called The Ram's or Ram's Islands.

== History ==
The population was reported to be 197 in the 1836 Census (the most populous island in Placentia Bay at the time), 100 in 1921 and 67 in 1940. Iona was originally settled by Irish Roman Catholics, which included but not limited to, the surnames of Griffin, Bruce, Fitzpatrick, Murphy, Sweeney, McFarrell (later McFarlane), Duke, Pope, Newman, Northover, Bird, Whiffen, and King. The depression of the 1930s severely impacted the Island's people, causing many people to leave and find work. Also, in 1935 a lightning storm struck and destroyed the Island's school, in the next year the small church located on the island was destroyed by fire, and in 1937 a North Atlantic storm splintered the Island's fleet, and washed away many homes and sheds. Most of the families who migrated from the island moved to the close communities of Ship Harbour, Fox Harbour and Long Harbour.

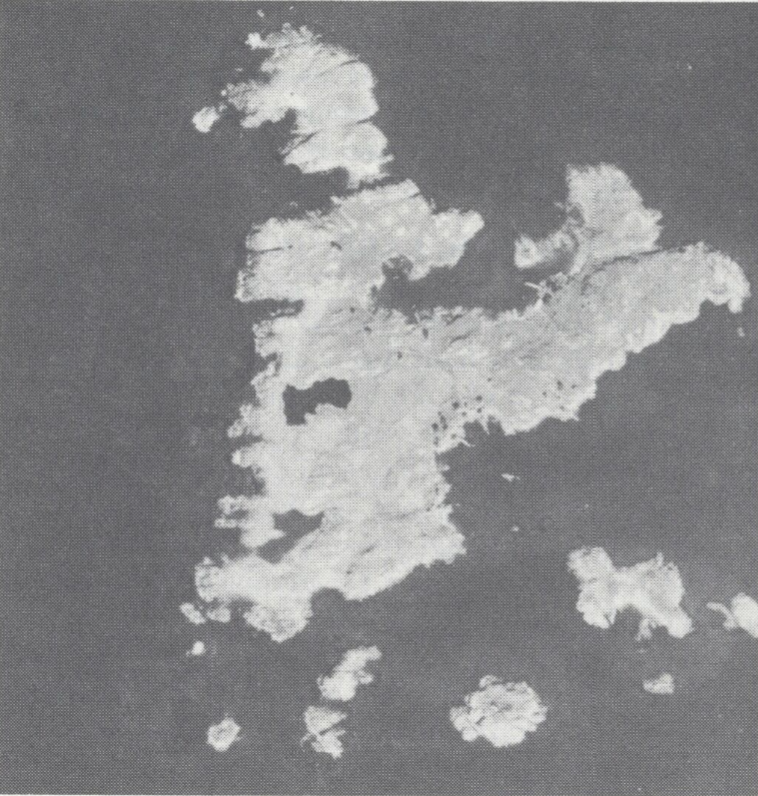
Aerial photo of Iona (Harbour Island), 1940s
