= MacFarland =

MacFarland is a surname, and may refer to:

- Frank Mace MacFarland (1869–1951), American malacologist
- Jean L. MacFarland, Canadian judge
- Karla Patricia Ruiz MacFarland, Mexican politician, 28th mayor of Tijuana
- Sean MacFarland, American general officer
- Tony MacFarland (born 1982), Mexican actor and television show host
- William Hamilton MacFarland(1799-1872), American and Confederate politician

== See also ==
- McFarland (surname)
- McFarlane (surname)
- McFarlan (disambiguation)
