= Queen's University Faculty of Law =

University in Ontario, Canada

Coordinates: 44.2275°N 76.49690°W

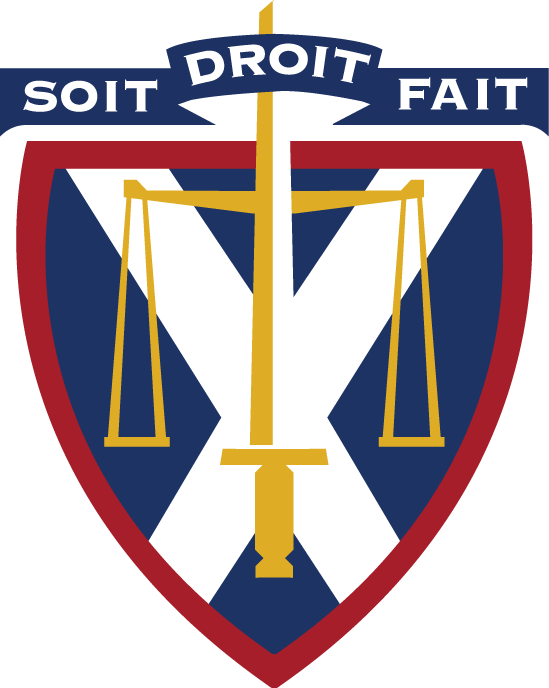
- Coat of Arms of the Faculty of Law
- Motto: Soit Droit Fait (French for 'Let Right Be Done')
- Parent school: Queen's University at Kingston
- Established: 1957; 69 years ago
- School type: Public law school
- Parent endowment: CA$2.17 billion (2026)
- Dean: Colleen M. Flood
- Location: Kingston, Ontario, Canada
- Enrollment: 496
- Faculty: 82.5
- Website: law.queensu.ca

The Queen's University Faculty of Law is a professional faculty of Queen's University at Kingston in Kingston, Ontario, Canada. According to the most recent ranking of law schools conducted in Canada by Maclean's, Queen's Law School is considered to be one of Canada's top law schools, tied for third with McGill.

While the tradition of legal education at Queen's University heralds back to 1861, the law school as it currently exists was officially established in 1957. Past and current professors at Queen's such as William Lederman, Toni Pickard, Gary Trotter, Allan Manson, Nick Bala and Don Stuart are routinely cited in Supreme Court of Canada and other appellate decisions. As consultants, advisors, and project directors, Queen's Law professors have made substantial contributions to various provincial and national law commissions, as well as national and international organizations. Queen's Alumni have gone on to play important roles as lawyers, judges, and politicians.

Queen's Law School is located at 128 Union Street in Kingston, Ontario. The building was inaugurated by Prime Minister John G. Diefenbaker in 1960, and was completely renovated in 2003. It houses the William R. Lederman Law Library, named after the former dean and respected scholar, which contains over 150,000 legal volumes.

== History ==
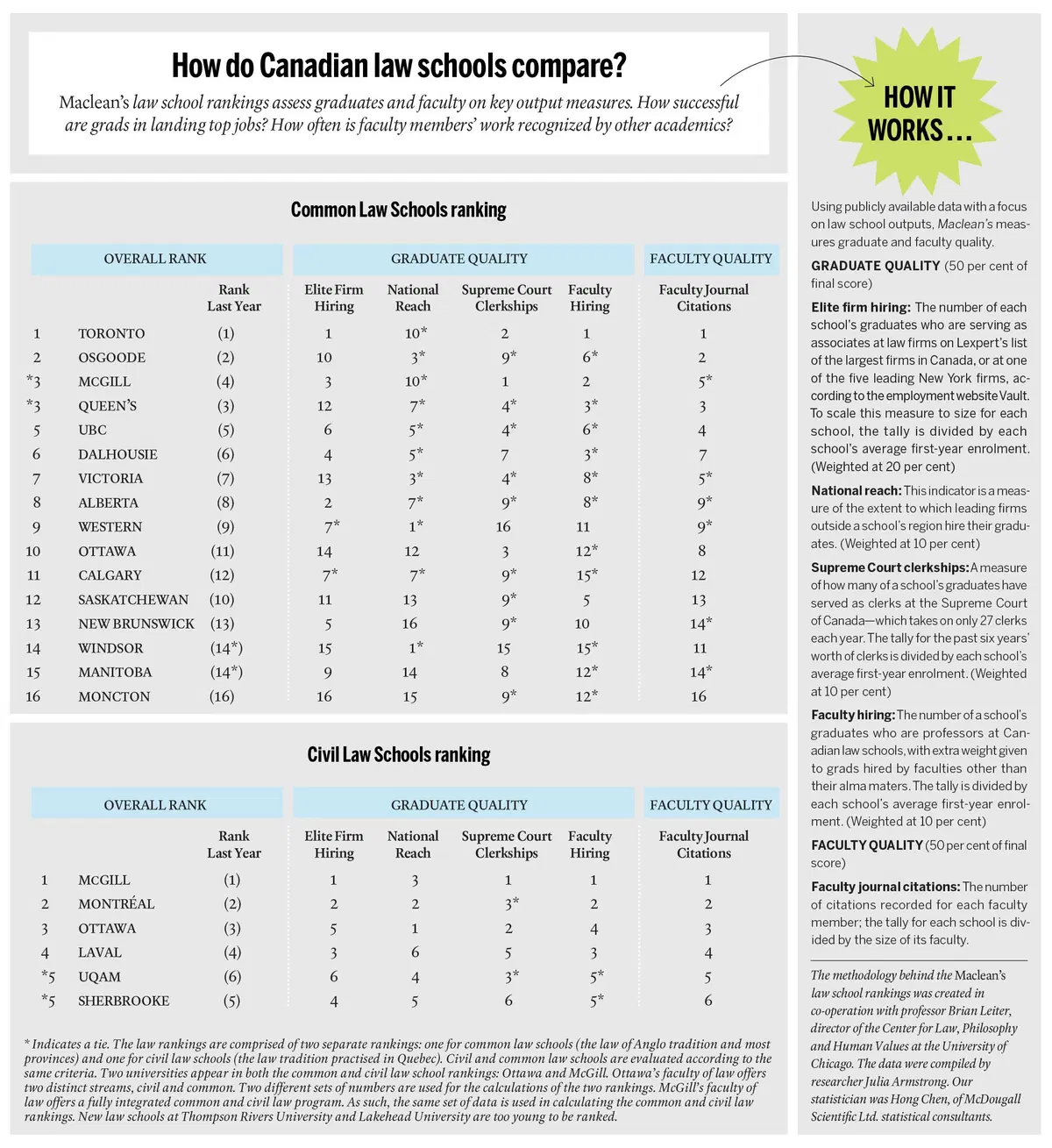
Most recent law school rankings produced by Macleans has the school placed in third, tied with Mcgill.

The first faculty of law at Queen's University was established in 1861, two years later awarding its first honorary Doctor of Laws degree to John A. Macdonald who would go on to serve as Canada's first Prime Minister. The first Dean of Law, Alexander Campbell, was also a "Father of Confederation". This early faculty only lasted a few years and efforts were made to revive the law school in 1880 although, again, after graduating a number of students the law school closed after a number of years largely because the Law Society of Upper Canada refused to recognize degrees awarded outside of Osgoode Hall. The modern law school was founded in 1957 with James Corry, Stuart Ryan and Daniel Soberman as the founding members of the faculty. In 1958, William Lederman, the pre-eminent constitutional law scholar of his era, became the first dean of the new law school.

Queen's Law continues to be a unique institution within the Canadian legal academic environment by, for instance, running the only Canadian legal study abroad program at the Queen's University campus at Herstmonceux Castle in East Sussex, England.

The Faculty of Law of Queen's University at Kingston's Arms were registered with the Canadian Heraldic Authority on April 20, 2007. The crest of Queen's University's Faculty of Law consists of a sword and the scales of justice superimposed on the Cross of St. Andrew. Professor Stuart Ryan, one of the law school's founding faculty members, gave the school its motto – Soit Droit Fait. The phrase has a double meaning. It is a statement of the power and creative potential inherent in the law that was used by medieval kings when assenting to bills passed by Parliament – "let the law be made." It is also an expression of the commitment to justice and decency implicit in the ideal of legality – "let right be done."

== Academics ==
=== Admissions ===
Most accepted applicants have completed a four-year university program. The preference is to accept those applicants who have an honours undergraduate degree, and many admitted students have attained graduate degrees as well. Acceptance into Queen's Law is highly competitive, with about 2,400 applicants vying for around 160 positions. The average LSAT score of accepted applicants is 163 and the average undergraduate GPA is 3.8 in the general category.

The Faculty Board and Queen's University Senate voted to change the LL.B. degree to a Juris Doctor (J.D.) designation to reflect the fact that the vast majority of Queen's Faculty of Law's graduates enter the program with at least one university degree.

=== Joint degrees ===
The faculty of law at Queen's University currently offers a Juris Doctor program (J.D.) and a graduate program in law (LL.M.). In addition, combined degree programs include a Master of Industrial Relations (M.I.R.), Master of Public Administration (M.P.A.), Master of Arts in economics (M.A.) and a Queen's School of Business Master of Business Administration (M.B.A.). The faculty of law also has a doctoral program.

=== Clinical programs ===
Practical experience is a major component of legal education at Queen's, with mandatory advocacy courses and a large proportion of the student body being engaged in one of the school's five pro bono legal clinics: Queen's Legal Aid, the Prison Law Clinic, the Queen's Business Law Clinic, Queen's Elder Law Clinic, and Queen's Family Law Clinic. The Clinics are located a short distance from the Queen's campus in downtown Kingston. In these programs students gain practical legal training and experience in the realm of social justice and advocacy. Queen's Law is the only university in Canada with a prison law clinic.

=== International opportunities ===
Queen's Law also offers exchange programs, visiting scholars and guest lecturers from law schools and legal institutions around the world, and the International Law Spring Program at the International Study Centre (ISC) at Herstmonceux Castle in East Sussex, England.

The International Law Spring Program at Herstmonceaux Castle offers an academic program in international law taught by practitioners and academics from around the world. The international law certificate program is split into three streams: International Public Law, International Business Law and Comparative International Law, and is open to accredited law schools in Canada and the United States and international universities with which Queen's is an exchange partner.

Taking advantage of the ISC's location, the International Law Spring Program includes a number of field trips to international institutions in Europe including the World Trade Organization in Geneva, the Canadian Mission to the European Union in Brussels, the International Criminal Tribunal in the Hague, the United Nations Office in Geneva, and the OECD in Paris, among other key institutions.

== Alumni ==
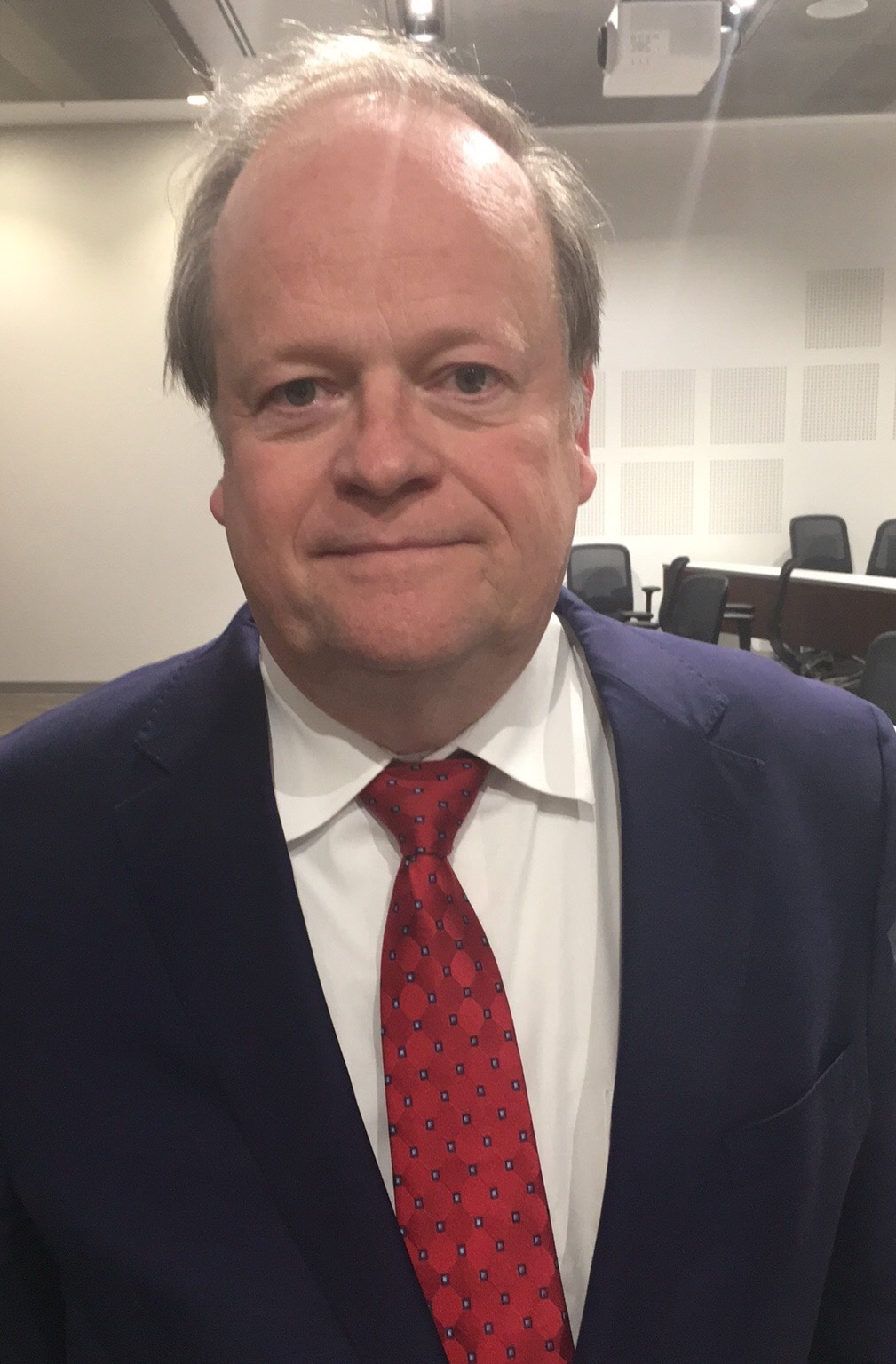
Supreme Court Justice Cromwell graduated with a Bachelors of Law from Queen's.

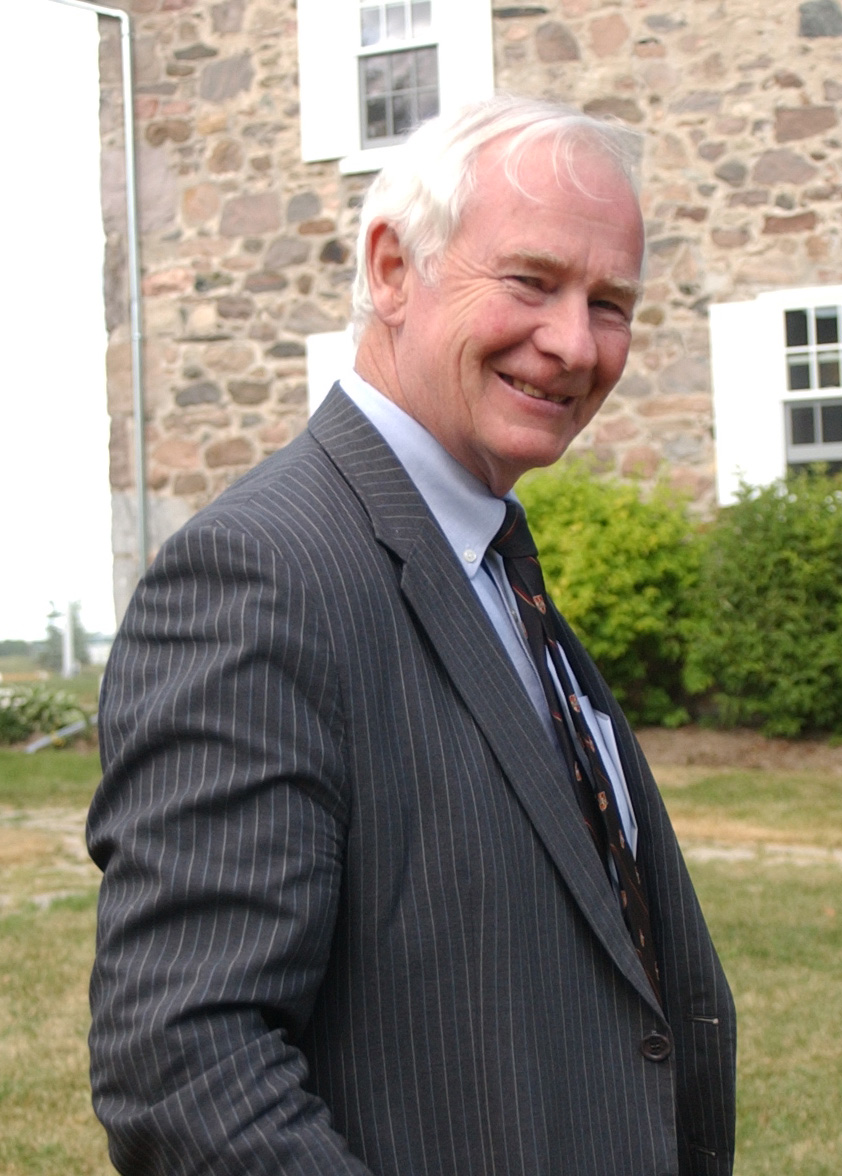
Former Governor General of Canada, David Lloyd Johnston graduated with a Bachelors of Law

Queen's has produced some of Canada's most famous and influential lawyers, from judges to politicians:

- Justice Harvey Brownstone (1980) – Canada's first openly gay judge, Ontario Court Justice, author of "Tug of War", host of "Family Matters with Justice Harvey Brownstone" (CHCH TV 2011–2013), now host of "Harvey Brownstone Interviews"
- Norihito, Prince Takamado
- Jock Climie (1998) – Lawyer, former CFL player
- Justice Thomas A. Cromwell (1976) – Retired Supreme Court of Canada Justice
- Justice David Stratas (1984) – Current Federal Court of Appeal Justice
- Mike Gillis (1989) – General Manager of the Vancouver Canucks
- David Lloyd Johnston (1966) – President of the University of Waterloo – Governor General of Canada
- Dhaman Kissoon – barrister and cricketer
- Jean L. MacFarland – Court of Appeal for Ontario
- David Paul Smith (1970) – Canadian Senator
- Catherine Latimer - Executive Director & Order of Canada
- Justice Grant Huscroft
- Justice David Watt
- Justice Heather Forster Smith
- Nathaniel Erskine-Smith
- Konrad Von Finckenstein
- Justice Jean MacFarland
- Yolande James
- Derek Sloan
- Gerry McNeilly, Director of Ontario's Office of the Independent Police Review
- Peter MacKinnon
- John Gerretsen
- John McKay
- Michael Lynk
- Kevin Davis
- Diana Buttu
- Ron McCallum
- Don Mitchell
- William Gladstone Ross
- Randeep Sarai
- Bradley C. S. Watson
- Paul-Matthieu Grondin
- Michael Fakhri
- Robert Amsterdam
- David Tilson
- Cynthia Peterson
- Monique Smith
- The Honourable J. Douglas Cunningham, Q.C.
- Ken Watkin
- Bill Bennett
- Edward Johnson
- Jacob Mantle
- Thomas D'aquino
- Sheila A. Murray, past president of CI Financial Corp and board member at BCE
- Donald Bayne
- Norman Farrell
- Justice Apple C. Newton-Smith

== Faculty ==
- William Lederman – OC (January 6, 1916 – July 26, 1992) was a Canadian constitutional scholar and the first dean of Queen's University Faculty of Law.
- Samuel Dahan – French legal scholar specializing in artificial intelligence and law.
- Bill Flanagan (academic) - Corporate law scholar; former Dean of Queen's Law (2005–2018)
- Gail E. Henderson - Business law scholar specializing in consumer protections and rights.

== See also ==
- List of law schools in Canada
