= Robert McFarland =

Robert White McFarland may refer to:

- Robert McFarland (American football) (born 1961), American football coach
- Robert McFarland (cricketer) (1847–1876), Australian cricketer
- Robert McFarland (Tennessee judge) (1832–1884), associate justice of the Tennessee Supreme Court
- Robert H. McFarland (1919–2008), judge of the United States District Court for the Canal Zone
- Robert White McFarland (1825–1910), American engineer

== See also ==
- Robert MacFarlane (disambiguation)
