= Judge McFarland =

Judge McFarland may refer to:

- Matthew W. McFarland (born 1967), judge of the United States District Court for the Southern District of Ohio
- Robert H. McFarland (1919–2008), judge of the United States District Court for the Canal Zone
- William McFarland (Tennessee politician) (1821–1900), judge of the Tennessee second judicial circuit

== See also ==
- Justice McFarland (disambiguation)
