= Seal Cove, Newfoundland and Labrador =

Seal Cove may refer to one of three settlements in the Canadian province of Newfoundland and Labrador:

- Seal Cove, Fortune Bay, Newfoundland and Labrador
- Seal Cove, White Bay, Newfoundland and Labrador
- Seal Cove on Conception Bay, a former settlement now part of the town of Conception Bay South
- Swells Cove, Newfoundland and Labrador, a former settlement
