= Colleen M. Flood =

Canadian professor

Colleen M. Flood FRSC FCAHS

Academic background
- Education: University of Auckland (BA, LL.B); University of Toronto (MA, PhD)

Academic work
- Discipline: Law
- Institutions: Queen's University

Colleen M. Flood FRSC FCAHS is the Dean of Queen's University Faculty of Law.

Prior to this, Dr. Flood was a Professor in the Faculty of Law at the University of Ottawa and University Research Chair in Health Law and Policy. She is also the Director for the University of Ottawa Centre for Health Law, Policy and Ethics. In addition, Flood served as a Professor at the University of Toronto and Scientific Director of the Canadian Institutes of Health Research. She is a Fellow of the Royal Society of Canada and the Canadian Academy of Health Sciences.

Since 2013, the Canadian Institutes of Health Research has awarded a prize in the name of Flood and Morris Barer to recognize a researcher who has made a significant impact on health services and policy research, policy, and/or care delivery.

== Education ==
Flood earned her Bachelor of Arts and Bachelor of Laws (with honors) at the University of Auckland before moving to study at the University of Toronto where she earned her Master of Laws and Doctor of Juridical Science.

== Career ==
In 1999, she was named the Labelle Lecturer in Health Services Research and was hired by the University of Toronto as a professor with an interest in health law. Later, her work has helped influence government policy making on health care. Her article on the Romanow Commission, co-authored by Sujit Choudhry, criticized the Canada Health Act and was cited in the 2002 Canadian Health Care system report by Michael J. L. Kirby. In 2004, Flood was appointed a Senior Fellow of Massey College.

In 2005, Flood and fellow University of Toronto faculty members Kent Roach and Lorne Sossin co-edited a book titled "The Legal Debate over Private Health Insurance in Canada." That same year, she was named an editor of a newly formed quarterly journal, Healthcare Policy. While working as an Associate Professor and Canada Research Chair in Health Law and Policy at the University of Toronto in 2006, Flood was appointed the new Scientific Director of Health Services and Policy Research within Canadian Institutes of Health Research. That same year, she edited a book titled "Just Medicare: What's In, What's Out, How We Decide" which discussed Canadian health law and policy based on conferences held at the University of Toronto Faculty of Law. In 2007, Flood was awarded the Jerry Lee Lectureship as part of the 7th Annual International Campbell Collaboration Colloquium. She was the first woman and Canadian to earn this Lectureship.

While with the Canadian Institutes of Health Research, Flood increased funding for health policy and research by creating a program called “Evidence on Tap.” The program, which was piloted in Saskatchewan, Ontario, and New Brunswick, involved health researchers meeting with government personnel to discuss where they needed research evidence. This led to the creation of the Evidence Informed Healthcare Renewal program. In 2011, Dr. Robyn Tamblyn replaced Flood as Scientific Director. She then took a sabbatical before returning to the University of Toronto.

Since 2013, the CIHR Institute of Health Services and Policy Research has awarded a prize in the name of Flood and Morris Barer to recognize a researcher who has had a significant impact on health services and policy research, policy, and/or care delivery. That same year, Flood was named an honorary member of the College of Family Physicians of Canada. In 2014, Flood was hired by the University of Ottawa for their Faculty of Law although she maintained her position as Canada Research Chair at the Faculty of Law for the University of Toronto until 2015. She also simultaneously served on the board of the Institute for Clinical Evaluative Sciences and as chair of their Scientific Advisory Committee.

In 2016, Flood was named a Fellow of the Royal Society of Canada for her impact on health care and policies. In 2018, while serving as the Director for the University of Ottawa Centre for Health Law, Policy and Ethics, Flood was elected as a Fellow of the Canadian Academy of Health Sciences.

== Publications ==
List of publications:

- Accountability of health service purchasers: comparing internal markets & managed competition in the United Kingdom, New Zealand, the Netherlands, and the United States (1997)
- Advanced health law : public policy and regulation (1998)
- Legal constraints on privately-financed health care in Canada : a review of the ten Provinces (2000)
- A patients' Bill of Rights: a cure for Canadians' concerns about medicare? (2002)
- Prescriptions from down under: can Canada import Australia's pharmaceutical benefits scheme? (2002)
- International health care forum: a legal, economic and political analysis (2002)
- What is in and out of Medicare?: Who decides? (2004)
- The boundaries of Canadian medicare : the role of Ontario's Physician Services Review Committee (2004)
- Access to care, access to justice (2005)
- Health system law and policy (2006)
- Legislating and litigating health care rights (2006)
- Data data everywhere: access and accountability? (2011)
- The right to health at the public/private divide: a global comparative study (2014)
- Law and mind: mental health law and policy in Canada (2016)
- Administrative law in context (2018)
- Universal pharmacare and federalism: policy options for Canada (2018)
