= Bunk Gardner (judge) =

American judge (1875–1960)

Judge of the United States District Court for the Canal Zone
- In office 1938–1948
- Appointed by: Franklin D. Roosevelt
- Preceded by: Charles Harwood
- Succeeded by: Joseph J. Hancock

United States Attorney for the Western District of Kentucky
- In office 1935–1938
- Appointed by: Franklin D. Roosevelt
- Preceded by: Thomas Sparks Jr.
- Succeeded by: Eli H. Brown III

Judge of the 1st Kentucky Circuit Court
- In office 1916–1922

Personal details
- Born: November 24, 1875 Mayfield, Kentucky
- Died: October 26, 1960 (aged 84) Mayfield, Kentucky
- Resting place: Highland Park Cemetery; Mayfield, Kentucky
- Occupation: Attorney

Bunk Gardner (November 24, 1875 – October 26, 1960) was an American lawyer and judge at various levels who was appointed by President Franklin D. Roosevelt to serve as the judge of the United States District Court for the Canal Zone, remaining in that office from 1938 to 1948.

== Early life, education, and career ==
Gardner "quit school at 15 and worked in a clothing store" where he remained until he was 23, during which time he also studied law in the office of Samuel Crossland. Gardner gained admission to the bar in Kentucky at the age of 24, and shortly thereafter became a city judge for Mayfield, Kentucky, remaining in that office for 17 years. From 1916 to 1922, he was a judge of the Kentucky First District, after which he returned to private practice. In April 1932, he was also appointed to the board of regents of Murray College in Frankfort, Kentucky, by Governor Ruby Laffoon.

== Federal offices ==
In January 1935, President Franklin D. Roosevelt appointed Gardner United States Attorney for the Western District of Kentucky. On March 7, 1938, Roosevelt nominated Gardner to the office of federal district judge for the Panama Canal zone, which had been vacated by the resignation of Judge Charles Harwood. Gardner was confirmed by the United States Senate on March 12.

Gardner was reappointed to the seat in 1946, but in March 1948 announced his intent to retire.

== Personal life and death ==
On August 12, 1915, Gardner married Winnie Winn, with whom he had one son. In 1958, Gardner was accused of forgery with respect to a codicil to his father's will, but a grand jury refused to indict him. In 1959, Gardner suffered from a broken hip, and died the following year at a hospital in Mayfield at the age of 83, following a long illness. His father's will continued to be contested at the time of Gardner's death.

Political offices
Preceded by Charles Harwood	Judge of the United States District Court for the Canal Zone; 1938–1948	Succeeded by Joseph J. Hancock
