= James Macfarlane =

James Macfarlane may refer to:

- James Macfarlane (Tasmanian politician) (1844–1914), member of the Australian Senate for Tasmania
- James Macfarlane (Western Australian politician) (1865–1942), member of the Western Australian Legislative Council
- James Macfarlane (moderator) (1808–1866), Scottish minister and ecclesiastical author
- James MacFarlane (1866–1942), New Zealand cricketer

== See also ==
- James Macfarlan (1832–1862), Scottish poet
