= MacFarlane =

MacFarlane may refer to:

- MacFarlane (surname), a surname
- Macfarlane Burnet, Australian virologist
- MacFarlane Lang, a biscuit firm which merged with McVitie & Price to form United Biscuits
- Macfarlane Group, a packaging and label company headquartered in Glasgow, Scotland
- Macfarlane, Queensland, a locality in the Blackall-Tambo Region, Australia

== See also ==
- Clan MacFarlane, a Highland Scottish clan
- McFarlane (surname)
- Alexander Macfarlane (disambiguation)
- McFarlane (disambiguation)
- MacFarlan
- McFarlin
