= Justice McFarland =

Justice McFarland may refer to:

- Ernest McFarland (1894–1984), chief justice of the Arizona Supreme Court
- Kay McFarland (1935–2015), chief justice of the Kansas Supreme Court
- Robert McFarland (Tennessee judge) (1832–1884), associate justice of the Tennessee Supreme Court
- Thomas Bard McFarland (1828–1908), associate justice of the Supreme Court of California

== See also ==
- Jean L. MacFarland (fl. 1970s–2020s), justice of the Court of Appeal for Ontario
- Judge McFarland (disambiguation)
