= Swells Cove =

- Fishing Cove
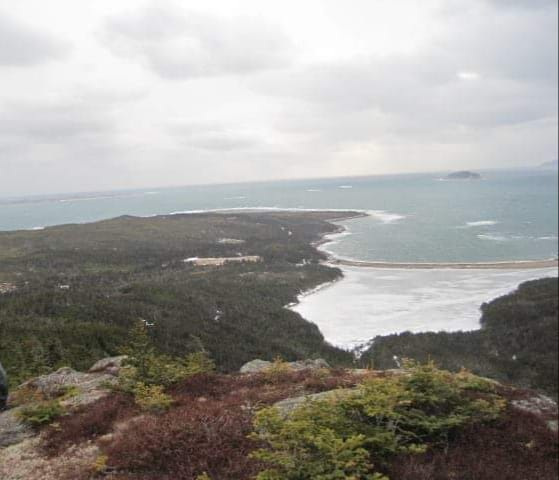
- Swells Cove from Swells Cove Hill

- Location of Swells Cove in Newfoundland
- Coordinates: 47°21′51.6″N 53°54′47.6″W
- Country: Canada
- Province: Newfoundland and Labrador

Population (1921)
  - Total: 9
- Time zone: UTC-3:30 (Newfoundland Time)
  - Summer (DST): UTC-2:30 (Newfoundland Daylight)
- Area code: 709

Swells Cove (formerly Seals Cove) was a small community in Newfoundland and Labrador. It is located near Ship Harbour, Placentia Bay, and is accessible from Ship Harbour through "The American Road".

== History ==
Fisherman from Iona, Argentia, and Ship Harbour and surrounding areas for many years in the 1800s used the Cove for fishing purposes. Until it was settled by the Griffin Families from Iona in the early 1900s. In 1921 Census of Newfoundland there were 9 people in 2 Households in the Cove. One family lived in "The Hole" and the other on the far right side beneath a small cliff. In the late 1920s, the family that had lived in "The Hole" had moved to Ship Harbour. By then 1 person had died in the other household and another had moved, and only a man named John Griffin remained.

By the Second World War Swells Cove had a barracks and had become a resting place for the soldiers working in nearby Ship Harbour Point and at the Argentia Naval Base. At the same time a road was built to Ship Harbour Point and Swells Cove via Ship Harbour and it was named "The American Road" after the American soldiers that built it. After the Second World War, Swells Cove Pond had become a favorite swimming place for the residents of Ship Harbour. By the early 1970s many Dory races were also held at the pond in the summer. A boardwalk had been built around the pond later in the 20th Century to accommodate the many small trout fishermen that were taking interest in the pond because of it being easily accessible, being a close proximity to Ship Harbour.
