= Dhaman Kissoon =

Guyanese-born Canadian cricketer

Personal information
- Full name: Dhaman Persaud Kissoon
- Born: 30 September 1956 (age 70); Nootenuzil, Demerara, British Guiana
- Batting: Unknown
- Bowling: Unknown

Career statistics
Competition	List A
Matches	5
Runs scored	16
Batting average	–
100s/50s	–/–
Top score	14*
Balls bowled	146
Wickets	1
Bowling average	123.00
5 wickets in innings	–
10 wickets in match	–
Best bowling	1/27
Catches/stumpings	–/–
- Source: Cricinfo, 30 January 2022

Dhaman Persaud Kissoon (born 30 September 1956) is a Guyanese-born Canadian barrister and former cricketer.

Kissoon was born at British Guiana in September 1956, from where he migrated to Canada in 1976. He studied economics at York University, before studying for his Bachelor of Laws in England at the University of Kent. From there he returned to Canada, where he completed his law studies at Queen's University Faculty of Law. Following the completion of his studies, Kissoon was asked to remain at Queen's as an adjunct professor. He was called to the bar in Ontario in 1991. A keen cricketer, he was a part of the Canadian squad for the 1996–97 Shell/Sandals Trophy, in which he played five List A one-day matches; he played two matches apiece against Jamaica and the Leeward Islands, and one against Trinidad and Tobago. Playing as a bowler in the Canadian side, he took just a single wicket across his five matches. These List A matches for Canada marked his only appearances for the team. In 2000, he established his own legal firm, Kissoon & Associates. In April 2021, he celebrated 30 years since being called to the Ontario Bar.
