= William McFarland =

William, Willie, Billy, Bill, or Will named McFarland or MacFarland may refer to:

== Musicians ==
- Bill McFarland, American trombonist who played for Southside Movement from 1973 to 1975
- Will McFarland, American guitarist on Billie Hughes's 1979 album Dream Master

== Politicians ==
- William Hamilton MacFarland (1799–1872), American legislator from Virginia
- William McFarland (Tennessee politician) (1821–1900), U.S. representative from Tennessee
- William M. McFarland (1848–1905), American politician from Iowa
- William Henry McFarland (1890–?), member of the Virginia House of Delegates
- William McFarland, Canadian alderman elected in the 1935 Hamilton, Ontario municipal election

== Sports figures ==
- Bill MacFarland (1932–2011), Canadian-born American ice hockey player
- Bill McFarland, American football player on the 1961 Oklahoma State Cowboys football team
- Willie McFarland, British jockey; 1990 winner of the Adonis Juvenile Hurdle

== Other persons ==
- Billy McFarland (loyalist), Northern Irish paramilitary, also known as "The Mexican"
- Billy McFarland (born 1991), American convicted felon
- William McFarland (security officer), Sergeant at Arms of the United States House of Representatives

== See also ==
- William McFarland House, American historic house in Worcester, Massachusetts, USA
- William McFarlane (disambiguation)
- McFarland (disambiguation)
- William (disambiguation)
