= Robert MacFarlane =

Robert MacFarlane or McFarlane may refer to:

== General ==
- Robert Macfarlan (schoolmaster) (1734–1804), Scottish writer, journalist and translator
- Sir Robert Henry MacFarlane (1771–1843), British Army officer during the Napoleonic Wars
- Robert MacFarlane, Lord Ormidale (1802–1880), Scottish advocate and judge
- Robert MacFarlane (Canadian politician) (1835–1872), Canadian politician
- Robert Stetson Macfarlane (1899–1982), American businessman
- Robert Macfarlane (New Zealand politician) (1900–1982), New Zealand politician
- Robert Gwyn Macfarlane (1907–1987), British hematologist
- Robert McFarlane (American government official) (1937–2022)
- Robert McFarlane (photographer) (1942–2023), Australian photographer
- Robert Macfarlan (Australian judge) (born 1949)
- Robert Macfarlane (writer) (born 1976), British travel writer

== Sports ==
- Robert MacFarlane (cricketer) (1908–1986), Scottish cricketer and administrator
- Robert McFarlane (cricketer) (born 1955), Australian cricketer
- Rab Macfarlane (1875–1943), Scottish footballer
- Bob McFarlane (footballer, died 1898) (?–1898), Scottish footballer
- Bob McFarlane (footballer, born 1887) (1887–1955), Scottish footballer and engineer
- Bobby McFarlane (1913–1971), Scottish footballer
- Bob McFarlane (Canadian athlete) (1927–2006), Canadian runner, football player and plastic surgeon
