= United States District Court for the Canal Zone =

1914–1982 United States District Court

- (D.C.Z.)
- Defunct
- Location: Ancon Hill
- Appeals to: Fifth Circuit
- Established: 1914
- Abolished: March 31, 1982

The United States District Court for the Canal Zone (in case citations, D.C.Z.) was a United States District Court which existed in the Panama Canal Zone of Panama from 1914 to 1982.

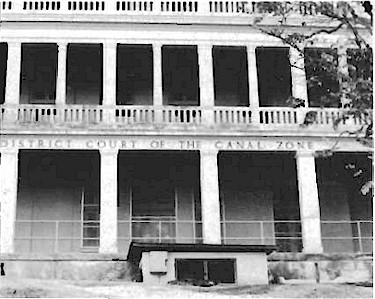
The Canal Zone Courthouse Building at Ancon Hill, site of the Canal Zone District Court which existed from 1914 until 1982.

The court sat at the Courthouse at Ancon Hill from 1914 to 1982, ordered as Governor Residence but completed in 1908 as Administration Building. Today only the shell of the building remains, as the roof and upper floors were demolished with all the remaining floors gutted.

Appeals were taken to the United States Court of Appeals for the Fifth Circuit.

== History ==
The District was established in 1914. It was originally under the War Department but in 1933 was transferred to the Department of Justice.

The court was abolished, effective March 31, 1982, as part of the process of transferring what had been the Canal Zone to Panama. Cases then pending in the Canal Zone court were transferred to the United States District Court for the Eastern District of Louisiana in New Orleans.

== Judges ==
#	Judge	State	Born–died	Active service	Chief Judge	Senior status	Appointed by	Reason for termination
1	William H. Jackson	NY	1864–1938	1914–1918	—	—	Wilson	term expiration
2	John W. Hanan	IN	1860–1931	1918–1921	—	—	Wilson	resignation
3	Charles Kerr	KY	1863–1950	1921–1922	—	—	Harding	resignation
4	John D. Wallingford	IN	1869–1924	1922–1924	—	—	Harding	death
5	Guy H. Martin	ID	1866–1933	1924–1929	—	—	Coolidge	term expiration
6	James J. Lenihan	IA	1887–1962	1929–1933	—	—	Coolidge	resignation
7	Richard C. P. Thomas	KY	1872–1939	1933–1937	—	—	F. Roosevelt	term expiration
8	Charles Harwood	NY	1880–1950	1937–1938	—	—	F. Roosevelt	resignation
9	Bunk Gardner	KY	1875–1950	1938–1948	—	—	F. Roosevelt	retirement
10	Joseph J. Hancock	KY	1886–1980	1948–1952	—	—	Truman	resignation
11	Guthrie F. Crowe	KY	1910–2010	1952–1977	—	—	Eisenhower	retirement
12	Robert H. McFarland	MS	1919–2008	1978–1979	—	—	Carter	resignation
