= Donald Macintosh =

Scottish clergyman and scholar

Donald Macintosh (Scottish Gaelic: Domhnall Mac an Tòisich) (1743–1808) was a Scottish clergyman, a nonjuror of the Scottish Episcopal Church, known as a scholar of Scottish Gaelic.

== Life ==
Born at Orchilmore, near Killiecrankie, Perthshire, Macintosh was son of a cooper and crofter. After attending the parish school, and acting for some time as a teacher, he went to Edinburgh. In 1774 he was acting as one of Peter Williamson's penny postmen; he next found employment as a copying clerk, and was subsequently tutor in the family of Stewart of Gairntully. For some years from 1785 he was employed in the office of Mr. Davidson, deputy-keeper of the signet and crown agent.

On 30 November 1786 Macintosh was elected to the honorary office of clerk for the Gaelic language to the Society of Antiquaries of Scotland, and held it until 1789. In 1789 James Brown, the sole representative of the nonjuring episcopal clergy of Scotland, made Macintosh as his successor, ordaining him deacon in June 1789, and later priest.

Macintosh appears for a time to have had no fixed residence, moving from place to place. He finally settled in Edinburgh, but made an annual tour through the Perthshire highlands as far north as Banff, Aberdeenshire, ministering to the small remnant who accepted his pastoral authority.

In 1794 Macintosh unsuccessfully raised an action in the court of session against the managers of the fund for the relief of poor Scottish episcopal clergymen, who had deprived him of his salary. In 1801 he was chosen Gaelic translator and keeper of Gaelic records to the Highland Society of Scotland, with a salary. He died unmarried at Edinburgh on 22 November 1808, the last representative of the nonjuring Scottish Episcopal church, and was buried in Greyfriars churchyard.

== Legacy ==
Macintosh's library of books and manuscripts, numbering about 2,000 volumes, he bequeathed to the town of Dunkeld. The books were kept together as The Macintosh Library, and additions were made; but the manuscripts may not have gone to Dunkeld.

== Works ==
Macintosh was compiler of A Collection of Gaelic Proverbs and Familiar Phrases; . . . with an English Translation . . . illustrated with Notes. To which is added The Way to Wealth, by Dr. Franklin, translated into Gaelic, Edinburgh, 1785. It was the first collection of Celtic proverbs. The translation of Benjamin Franklin's Way to Wealth was by Robert Macfarlane, an Edinburgh schoolmaster, for the Earl of Buchan, to whom the book is dedicated. A second edition was made by Alexander Campbell (1819). Another collection, based on Macintosh's, was published under the editorship of Alexander Nicolson (1881, and again in 1882).

Walter Scott drew liberally on Macintosh's work for the Gaelicized phraseology of the character Evan Dhu Maccombich in Waverley (1814).

The catalogues of Gaelic manuscripts belonging to the Highland Society, and others given in vol. iii. of the London Highland Society's Ossian, were compiled by Macintosh, who also transcribed some of the manuscripts. He collected old poetry; a piece from Lochaber in 1784, Ceardach Mhic Luin, appeared in the Sean Dain (1786) of the Perth bookseller John Gillies (p. 233).

== Notes ==
Attribution

This article incorporates text from a publication now in the public domain: Lee, Sidney, ed. (1893). "Macintosh, Donald". Dictionary of National Biography. Vol. 35. London: Smith, Elder & Co.
