= Samuel Dahan =

French legal academic

- Born: 25 November 1984 (age 41); Nice, France
- Education: University of Côte d'Azur University of Paris 1 Sorbonne – École Normale Supérieure University of Cambridge
- Occupation: Professor of Law Lawyer Entrepreneur
- Website: law.queensu.ca/directory/samuel-dahan

Samuel Dahan (born 25 November, 1984) is a law professor at Queen's University at Kingston, Canada, and the Founding Director of the Conflicts Analytics Lab, a research consortium focusing on the application of artificial intelligence (AI) in law, compliance matters, and dispute resolution. He is known for pioneering open-source legal technology platforms, including OpenJustice, the Deel AI Classifier, and MyOpenCourt.

Dahan's research lies at the intersection of legal AI, employment law, dispute resolution and negotiations. He also holds visiting faculty positions at Cornell University, Paris Dauphine University, Ecole Nationale d’Administration (ENA), and Harvard University.

== Early life and education ==
Dahan was born on 25 November 1984, in Nice, France. He completed his primary education at Or Torah School.

Dahan received his Bachelor of Laws degree (LL.B.) from the University of Côte d’Azur (Nice, France) in 2005 and went on to obtain a Master of Laws (LL.M.) from KU Leuven (previously part of the European Academy of Legal Theory, University of Brussels) in 2008, during which he also sent time at Harvard Law School as an exchange student. He also obtained a Master of Arts (Theory and Practice of Litigation) from the University of Paris 1 Sorbonne – École Normale Supérieure, Ulm in 2009.

In 2014, Dahan earned a Doctorate in Law (Ph.D.) from the University of Cambridge under the supervision of Professor Simon Deakin and his thesis focused on financial crisis and the European monetary union.

Samuel competed in kickboxing and taekwondo at an elite level, earning bronze and silver medals at both the French and UK championships. He also served as captain of the Cambridge Taekwondo team, leading them to victory in the Oxford–Cambridge varsity match in both disciplines.

== Academic career ==
Samuel Dahan began his academic career as a Visiting Scholar for the program on Negotiation at Harvard Law School from 2007 to 2008. He then served as a Lecturer at ESSEC Business School, Paris from 2008 to 2010, where he taught courses in Alternative Dispute Resolution. He was also a Lecturer at École Nationale d’Administration, Strasbourg, from 2008 until 2016.

From 2013 to 2015, Dahan served as a Clerk at the French Administrative Supreme Court (Conseil d’État). He then held two concurrent roles: (a) Rudloff Schlesinger Visiting Assistant Professor at Cornell Law School, and (b) Postdoctoral Fellow at the Jean Monnet Center of New York University.

Dahan has also served as an Affiliate Lecturer at Harvard Kennedy School at Harvard University. Additionally, between 2016 and 2018, he was a Cabinet Member (Référendaire) at the Court of Justice of the European Union.

Dahan joined the Faculty of Law at Queen’s University in 2018 as a Queen's National Scholar and Assistant Professor. Later on, he was promoted to the position of Associate Professor with tenure in 2022. He has served as Director of the Conflict Analytics Lab since 2019 and as a Fellow at the Ingenuity Lab, Department of Electrical and Computer Engineering at Queen's University since 2020.

From 2022 to 2024, Dahan served as Chief of Policy at Deel. He currently holds the position of Chair and Head of Research at the Deel Lab for Global Work. Additionally, he has held several visiting and affiliate academic appointments: he has been a Visiting Associate Professor and Adjunct Professor at Cornell Law School since 2015, an Affiliate Faculty member at the Program on Negotiation at Harvard University since 2015, and a Visiting Professor of Law at Paris Dauphine University since 2017.

== Major projects ==
Samuel Dahan played a pivotal role in the establishment of "OpenJustice", an open-source platform that enables legal professionals and courts to embed legal reasoning into AI systems using a no-code interface. Designed to enhance access to justice and ensure the reliability of AI legal tools, OpenJustice enables the creation of transparent, domain-specific dialogue flows that reflect real legal logic – cited, tested, and refined by a growing international community.

OpenJustice is supported by multi-million-dollar research grants and institutional partnerships with organizations including the French Supreme Court (Cour de Cassation), Osler, Hoskin and Harcourt LLP, Miller Thomson LLP, Dentons LLP, Edilex and Deel.

== Research and publications ==
Samuel Dahan's research focuses on data analytics and legal technology, mediation and conflict resolution, employment law, consumer law, and trademark disputes. He is also focusing on his forthcoming book titled "Lawyers in the Age of AI: Building Open Platforms for Legal Transformation" (2026).

=== Articles, chapters and notable publications ===
- Shayanfar R., Bhambhoria, R., Luo, C., Zhu, X., Dahan, S. (2025) – CoDial: Enabling Zero-Shot Task-Oriented Dialogue Through Programmatic Logic Generation, EMNLP 2025.
- Luo, X., Zhu, R., Bhambhoria, S. Dahan (2024) – Misinformation with Legal Consequences: A New Task Towards Harnessing Societal Harm of Misinformation, ACL (Association for Computational Linguistics).
- Li, J., Bhambhoria, R., Dahan, S., Zhu, X. (2024) – Experimenting with Legal AI Solutions: The Case of Question-Answering for Access to Justice, ICML Gen AI Law Workshop.
- Luo, C. F., Bhambhoria, R., Zhu, Dahan S. (2023) – Prototype-Based Interpretability for Legal Citation Prediction, ACL (Association for Computational Linguistics), pp. 4883-4898.
- Dahan, S., Luo, C. F., Bhambhoria, R., Zhu, X. (2023) – Towards Legally Enforceable Hate Speech Detection for Public Forums, EMNLP.
- Bhambhoria, R., Liu, H., Dahan, S., Zhu, X. (2022) – Interpretable Low-Resource Legal Decision Making, AAAI Conference on Artificial Intelligence, AAAI, pp. 11819-11827.
- Dahan, S., Bouaziz P. (2023) – "What is an Employer of Record? Here's How They Can Help Firms Embrace Global Working," World Economic Forum.

== Research grants ==
- 2022 – 2024: SSHRC Insight Development Grant – Building Accessible Vaccine Support Programs ($73,520).
- 2020 – 2021: MITACS – BLG – AI powered system for Personal Injury Dispute Resolution ($120,000).
- 2019 – 2022: SSHRC New Frontiers Research Grant – AI Powered Tribunal for Small Claims ($250,000).
- 2015 – 2016: The Jean Monnet Center for International and Regional Economic Law & Justice, Emile Noel Research Fellowship ($35,000).
- 2010 – 2013: Bourse du President, Sorbonne Paris, PhD Scholarship ($45,000; $15,000 per year).
- 2012 – 2013: University of Cambridge, Modern Law Review Scholarship, PhD Support ($17,149).

== Public speaking engagements, conferences and lectures ==
- AI in Hiring and the Future of Work, UN AI for Good – Law Track Conference, Stanford Law School (2025).
- Keynote Speaker at the 18th Family Law Summit (2024), Law Society of Ontario – Toronto, ON, Canada.
- French Supreme Court Hearing, AI Working Group – Paris, France (2024).
- TEDxQueen’s – Me , Myself, A.I – Kingston, ON, Canada (2020).
- Ontario Bar Association AI Officer Hours (2025), Ontario Bar Association, Toronto, Ontario.

== Awards and honors ==
- 2025 – Inaugural Scholar – Queen's Law Research Excellence Scholars Program.
- 2024 – Best Paper Award, 4th Machine Learning Lawyering Conference, Chinese University of Hong Kong.
- 2021 – Stanley M. Corbett Award for Excellence in Teaching, Queen’s University.
- 2021 – Best Paper Award, IEEE International Conference on Data Mining workshop on Mining and Learning.

== Media appearances and interviews ==
- OpenJustice.AI – A Conversation with Professor Samuel Dahan, LMI Podcast (2024).
- Deel: Helping Companies Navigate a Changing Global Employment Landscape, Orrick Tech Studio (2023).
- Vaccine Mediations – A Conversation with Samuel Dahan, Lawyers & Mediators International Show & Podcast (2021).
- Legal advice powered by AI – Samuel Dahan, Lawyer and Professor at Queen's University, Analytics by Design Conference (2020).

== Professional service and engagements ==
As part of his professional engagements, Samuel Dahan has held several notable positions in European and international institutions. He has served as a Cabinet Member at the Court of Justice of the European Union for two consecutive years from 2016 to 2018, Policy Adviser at the European Commission (DG for Economic and Financial Affairs) from 2011 to 2012, Policy Adviser at the Directorate for Financial and Enterprise Affairs (2011), and as a clerk for the French Administrative Supreme Court (Conseil d’État).
