= James Brown (Scottish clergyman) =

Scottish clergyman

James Brown (c. 1734 – 9 November 1791) was a clergyman in the Scottish Episcopal Church, notable as one of a few Jacobite dissenters who refused to abandon their allegiance to the House of Stuart when directed to do so in 1788.

== Life ==
James Brown was born around 1734. The son of a Jacobite farmer who died in the Battle of Culloden in 1746, he retained the same Jacobite allegiances throughout his life. He married Helen Taylor, daughter of an Episcopalian minister, and they had a son, Robert, who would become a notable botanist, giving his name to his discovery of Brownian motion.

Brown was minister at Montrose in 1788 when Charles Edward Stuart died. The Scottish Episcopal Church had long supported the House of Stuart, but found it impossible to support Charles' heir, his brother Henry Benedict Stuart, who was a cardinal of the Roman Catholic Church. Accordingly, the bishops of the Scottish Episcopal Church met and agreed to recognise George III. 25 May 1788 was set as the day upon which services were to include prayers for King George III for the first time, and on that day the directive was followed by all but two ministers, Brown and Charles Rose, the Bishop of Dunblane and Dunkeld.

Around 1790, Brown moved to Edinburgh, where he became pastor to the remaining Jacobite dissenters. On presenting himself to the old and increasingly senile Rose, he was consecrated as a bishop. When questioned later, Rose denied having done so, suggesting that perhaps his sister had. Rose had no authority to consecrate Brown, as the canon required no fewer than three consecrating bishops, although the nonjuring church in England had relied on such consecrations. The Episcopal Bishops were furious at Brown's consecration and declared it null and void. Some accused Brown of taking advantage of Rose's senility in order to advance his own position, but it is equally likely that Rose was perfectly aware of what he was doing and, as a strong Jacobite, would have desired the non-juring laity to be catered for. The following year Rose died, making Brown the last remaining minister to the Jacobite dissenters.

== Succession ==
Brown ordained Donald Macintosh as deacon in 1789 and later priest. Macintosh then continued the ministry for some years, living to 1808.
