= David Stratas =

Canadian jurist

Federal Court of Appeal
- Incumbent
- Assumed office December 11, 2009
- Nominated by: Stephen Harper
- Preceded by: Pierre Blais

Personal details
- Born: October 21, 1960 (age 65) Toronto, Ontario
- Education: Queen's Law School; University of Oxford

David W. Stratas (born 1960) is a Canadian jurist. He has served on the Federal Court of Appeal since 2009 and the Court Martial Appeal Court of Canada since 2012.

== Biography ==
David W. Stratas was born in 1960 in Toronto, Ontario.

Stratas was educated at Queen's University, earning an LL.B. in 1984 and Oxford University, earning a B.C.L. in 1986. He then returned to Canada and clerked for Justice Bertha Wilson of the Supreme Court of Canada. He proceeded to practise law as a litigator at Toronto law firms, including Osler, Hoskin & Harcourt and Heenan Blaikie.

From 1994 until his appointment to the Federal Court of Appeal in 2009, he served as an adjunct professor at Queen's Law School.
