= William H. Jackson (judge) =

American judge (1864–1938)

William H. Jackson (1864 – December 11, 1938) was a judge of the United States District Court for the Canal Zone from 1914 to 1918.

Jackson was born in Holly Springs, Mississippi, but spent most of his early life in Nashville, Tennessee. His father was Howell E. Jackson, who served as a justice of the Supreme Court of the United States. He received a B.A. from Vanderbilt University in 1883, followed by a law degree from Harvard Law School.

After law school, he was counsel for Chesapeake and Ohio Railway. He would later become a district attorney and judge of the Superior Court of Cincinnati, Ohio. He would then move to New York City, before he was appointed by William Howard Taft to the Supreme Court for the Panama Canal Zone, before it became a US District Court. In 1914, when it became a district court, he was appointed to that court by Woodrow Wilson. In 1920, during the Military Government of Santo Domingo, Jackson was a justice on the Supreme Court of the Republic of Santo Domingo.

In 1938, Jackson died at his New York City apartment.

Political offices
| Preceded by Newly created seat | Judge of the United States District Court for the Canal Zone; 1914–1918 | Succeeded by John W. Hanan |
