= Charles Kerr (judge) =

American judge (1863–1950)

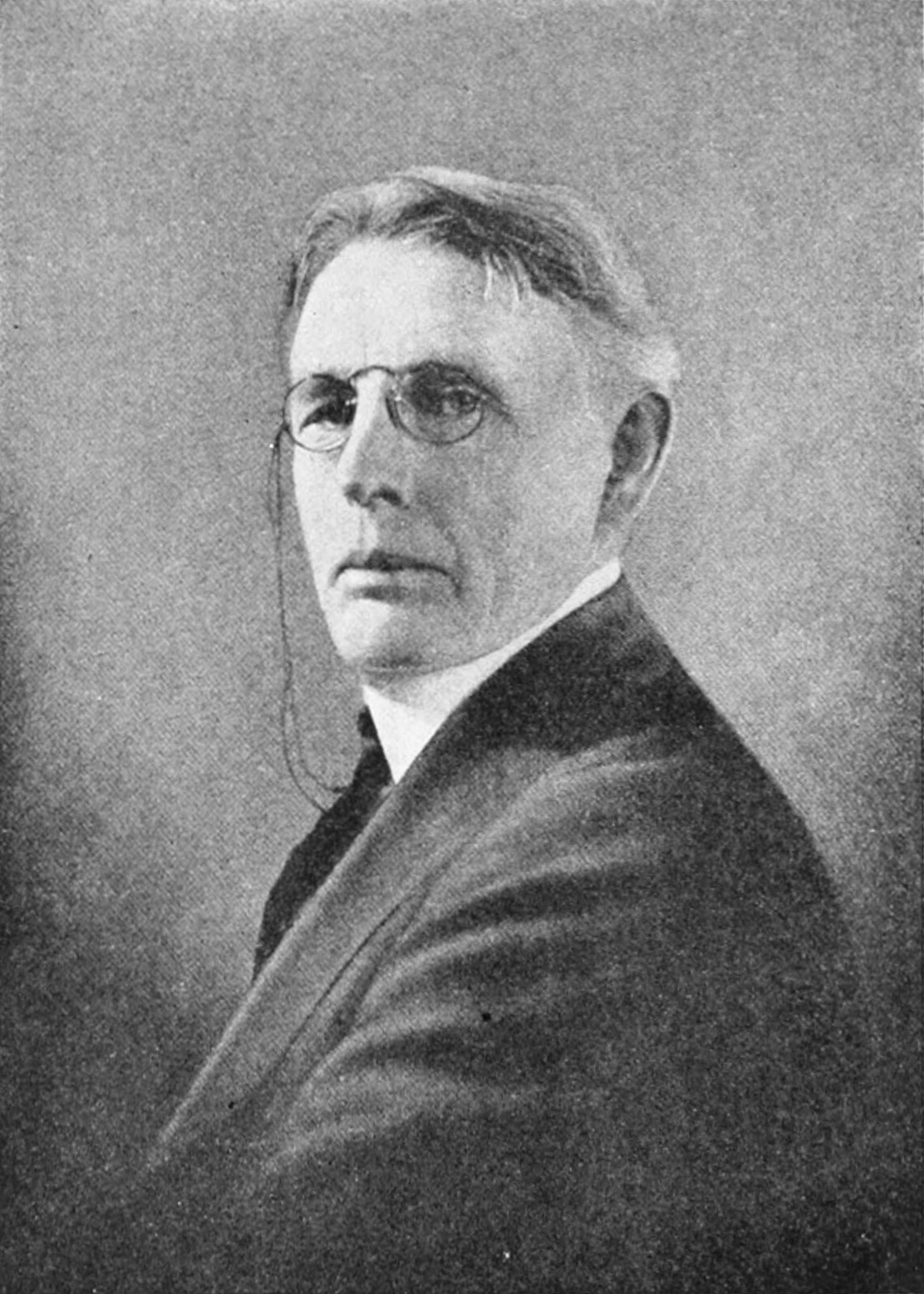
Photograph of Kerr

Charles Kerr (1863 – February 15, 1950) was an American lawyer and government official who served as a judge of the United States District Court for the Canal Zone from 1921 to 1922.

== Early life, education, and career ==
Born in Maysville, Kentucky, Kerr read law to gain admission to the bar, beginning his legal career in Lexington, Kentucky, in 1886.

He was appointed as a judge of the Kentucky Circuit Court in 1911 and served until 1921, resigning from that court on June 1, 1921.

== Federal judicial service ==
In March 1921, it was reported that Kerr was one of "two Lexington men... slated as virtually certain federal appointees under the Harding administration according to authoritative information secured here today", with Kerr expected to be appointed as a federal Judge in the Panama Canal Zone. Kerr's nomination was confirmed by the United States Senate on May 31, 1921, and he thereafter moved to the Canal Zone with his family.

During a visit to Lexington in June 1922, the local bar and court officials interrupted proceedings to extend him an enthusiastic welcome back to the city where he had long practiced and served as a judge. Although he and his family found the Canal Zone climate difficult, Kerr remarked that conditions there were "intensely interesting". He dismissed rumors that he might seek a more prominent government post in Washington or run for the United States Senate from Kentucky. Kerr resigned his judgeship in July 1922, in part due to the ill health of his wife.

== Later life ==
Following his service in the Canal Zone, Kerr was name a special assistant to United States Attorney General Harry M. Daugherty from 1922 to 1925, investigating fraud arising from World War I. In 1924 Kerr was appointed to the American-Mexican Claims Commission and moved to Washington, D.C., full-time. Kerr became known for his work in labor arbitration, chairing boards that mediated wage disputes between railroads and unions. In 1937, President Franklin D. Roosevelt appointed Kerr to an emergency board convened to resolve a dispute involving the Southern Pacific Railway. He was a partner in the Washington, D.C., law firm Esch, Kerr, Taylor & Shipe, for many years.

He later co-authored a two-volume history of Kentucky with E. Merton Coulter (1890–1981) and William E. Connelley (1855–1930). He received an honorary LL.D. degree from Transylvania University in 1930.

== Personal life and death ==
On October 27, 1896, Kerr married Linda Payne of Lexington, Kentucky, with whom he had one son and one daughter. His wife and children moved to Panama with him for the duration of his service there.

Linda Kerr died of a heart attack in Washington, D.C., in December 1936, and Kerr spent the last fourteen years of his life as a widower. Kerr died at Emergency Hospital in Washington, D.C., from a heart attack at the age of 86.

Political offices
Preceded by John W. Hanan	Judge of the United States District Court for the Canal Zone; 1921–1922	Succeeded by John D. Wallingford
