= Gail E. Henderson =

Canadian legal scholar

- Occupation: Professor of Law
- Education: Bachelor of Laws (LL.B.), Osgoode Hall Law School, York University – 2005 Master of Laws (LL.M.), University of Toronto – 2009 Doctor of Juridicial Science (S.J.D), University of Toronto – 2014

Website
- law.queensu.ca/directory/gail-henderson

Gail E. Henderson is a Canadian legal scholar and Associate Professor at the Faculty of Law, Queen’s University whose areas of research and teaching include consumer financial protection, financial literacy and investor education, securities regulation, corporate law and contracts. Her academic expertise has established her as a leading voice in Canadian financial regulation and consumer protection law.

Henderson has recently been appointed to the Investor Advisory Panel of the Ontario Securities Commission. Her scholarship continues to influence national debates on financial literacy and criminal interest rates, and her research has been supported by major grants from the Social Sciences and Humanities Research Council of Canada totaling nearly $330,000. Henderson's work bridges academic research with practical policy application, as evidenced by her service on multiple government advisory committees including the Consumer Protection Advisory Committee of the Financial Consumer Agency of Canada.

Before joining legal academia, Henderson gained significant legal experiences as a law clerk to the Honourable Louise Charron at the Supreme Court of Canada and as an Associate (Litigation Department) at Osler, Hoskin & Harcourt LLP.

== Early life and education ==
Henderson completed her Bachelor of Laws (LL.B.) at Osgoode Hall Law School, York University, graduating as a gold medalist in 2005 and went on to obtain a Master of Laws (LL.M.) from the University of Toronto in 2009.

Henderson also earned a Doctor of Juridical Science from the University of Toronto. Her doctoral dissertation, titled A Duty to Minimize the Corporation's Environmental Impacts: Corporate Governance and Sustainable Development, was supervised by Professor Mohammad Fadel and Professor Ian Lee. The examining committee included Professor Anita Anand and Professor Andrew Green, with Professor Richard Janda serving as the external reviewer.

== Academic career ==
Henderson's academic career began at the University of Alberta, Faculty of Law where she served as an Assistant Professor from 2013 to 2016. Subsequently, she joined the Faculty of Law at Queen’s University in 2016 as an Assistant Professor and served in that role until 2019.

In 2019, Henderson was promoted to the position of Associate Professor at Faculty of Law, Queen’s University. She also served as Associate Dean (Faculty Relations) from 2020 to 2022, and Interim Associate Dean (Academic Policy) in 2022. In these roles, she was instrumental in developing and implementing policies for both on-campus and remote teaching during the COVID-19 pandemic, ensuring continuity and adaptability in legal education.

== Research and selected publications ==
Henderson's research encompasses various facets of corporate and securities law, including consumer financial protection, financial literacy and investor education, securities regulation, corporate law, and contracts.

=== Journal articles ===
- Gail E Henderson and Katlin Abrahamson, "Informing the Debate on Lowering the Criminal Rate of Interest" (2024) 47:1 Dalhousie Law Journal 121–158 (peer-reviewed).
- Gail E Henderson, Pamela Beach and Andrew Coombs, "Financial Literacy Education in Ontario: An Exploratory Study of Elementary Teachers' Perceptions, Attitudes, and Practices" (2021) 44:2 Canadian Journal of Education 308–336 (peer-reviewed).
- Kevin Akrong and Gail E Henderson, "COVID-19 and the Regulation of Alternative Financial Services" (2021) 46 Queen’s Law Journal 357–372.

=== Book chapters ===
- "Securities Regulators and Investor Education" in Stephanie Ben-Ishai, ed, Dangerous Opportunities: The Future of Financial Institutions, Housing Policy, and Governance (University of Toronto Press, 2021), 65–82.
- "Indigenous Entrepreneurship and Social Entrepreneurship in Canada" in Dwight Newman, ed, Business Implications of Aboriginal Law (LexisNexis, 2018), 241-78.
- "Banks, Corporate Governance and the Public Interest: The Potential Role of Public Interest Directors" in Innovations in Corporate Governance – Global Perspectives (Edward Elgar, 2017), 193–216.

=== Book reviews ===
- "Insider Trading and Market Manipulation: Investigating and Prosecuting Across Borders, Janet Austin (Cheltenham, UK: Edward Elgar, 2017)" (2018) 34.1 Banking and Finance Law Review 71–77.
- "Policing the Markets: Inside the Black Box of Securities Enforcement, James W. Williams (New York: Routledge, 2012)" (2014) 29.2 Banking and Finance Law Review 407-10.

=== Research grants ===
- "2017: Co-Applicant, SSHRC Insight Grant for "Household Finances and Vulnerable Canadians: Using Financial Diaries to Examine and Build Capability," awarded $262,871.
- 2017: Principal Applicant, SSHRC Insight Development Grant for "This Little Piggy Went Banking: Examining Potential Conflicts of Interest in Financial Literacy Education Resources for Elementary Teachers", awarded $67,114.
- 2016: Co-Investigator, Law Foundation of Ontario Access to Justice Fund for "Group RESP Research and Education Project", awarded $92,500.
- 2011: Canadian Foundation for Governance Research – Robert Bertram Doctoral Research Award, awarded $15,000.

== Awards and honors ==
Henderson has been the recipient of several accolades throughout her academic journey, including the SSHRC's Doctoral Fellowship ($40,000) in 2011, Ontario Graduate Scholarship ($10,000) in 2010, and Graduate Fellowship in Capital Markets at the University of Toronto ($15,000) in 2009.

== Service and engagements ==
Henderson has been an active contributor to both the academic and professional legal communities throughout her career. Her service includes roles within law committees, editorial boards, and regulatory bodies. In addition to her academic achievements, Henderson has participated in the evaluation of research grants, and held leadership positions in various legal and community organizations. A selection of her notable roles is highlighted below:

=== Current roles ===
- Member, Investor Advisory Panel, Ontario Securities Commission (2025–Present).
- Member, Editorial Board, Canadian Business Law Journal (2022 – Present).
- Treasurer, The Canadian CED Network (CCEDNet) (2020 – Present).
- Member of the Board of Directors, CCEDNet (2019 – Present).

=== Past roles ===
- Member, Consumer Protection Advisory Committee of the Financial Consumer Agency of Canada (2020–2025).
- Member, Research Advisory Committee: Consumer Debt in Canada, Prosper Canada (2019–2020).
- Assessor, Ireland Canada University Foundation James M Flaherty Program – Flaherty Research Scholarship (2016–2018).
- Law Clerk to the Honorable Lousie Charron, Supreme Court of Canada (2005–2006).
