= William Lederman =

Canadian constitutional scholar

- Born: William Ralph Lederman; January 6, 1916; Regina, Saskatchewan, Canada
- Died: July 26, 1992 (aged 76)
- Awards: Order of Canada

William Ralph Lederman, OC (January 6, 1916 – July 26, 1992) was a Canadian constitutional scholar and the first dean of Queen's University Faculty of Law.

Born in Regina, Saskatchewan, he received a LL.B. from the University of Saskatchewan in 1940. He served in the Royal Canadian Artillery from 1941 to 1945, serving with a light anti-aircraft regiment in the United Kingdom and Northwest Europe. He was a Rhodes Scholar and a Vinerian Scholar where he received a B.C.L. From 1949 to 1958 he taught at Dalhousie University. In 1958, he became the first Dean of the Queen's University Faculty of Law. He was in this post until 1968 and continued to teach in the faculty until the 1980s. He was constitutional adviser to Ontario Premier John Robarts between 1965 and 1971.

In 1981, he was made an Officer of the Order of Canada.
