= Disappearance of Amber McFarland =

2008 disappearance in Manitoba, Canada

Amber McFarland
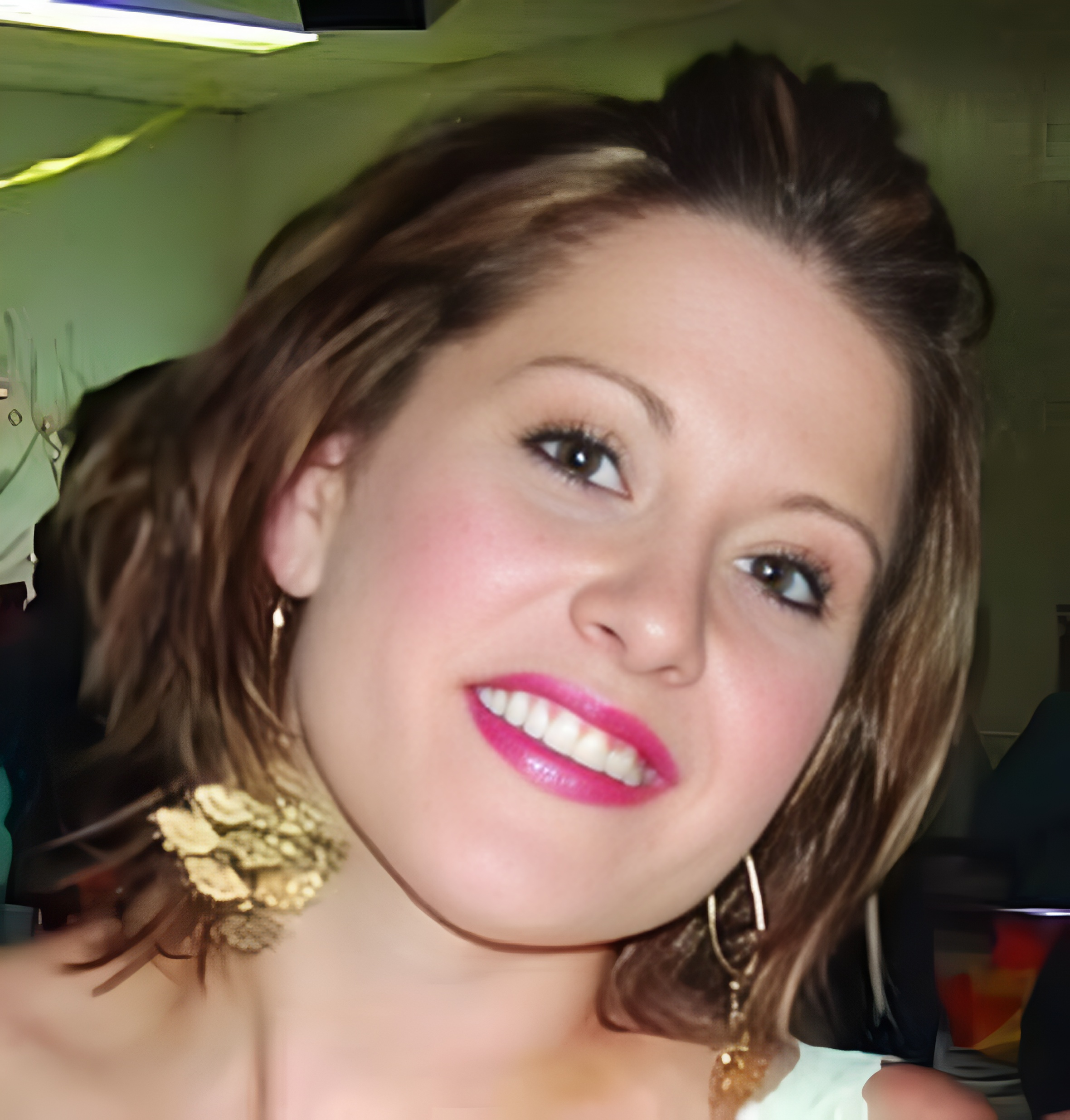
- Born: July 28, 1984
- Disappeared: 18 October 2008; Portage la Prairie, Manitoba, Canada
- Status: Missing; presumed dead
- Known for: Unsolved disappearance

Amber Lynn McFarland (born 28 July 1984) is a Canadian woman who disappeared in October 2008 from Portage la Prairie, Manitoba. Her case, later classified as a homicide by the Royal Canadian Mounted Police, has received sustained regional media coverage and public attention, including extensive reporting by CBC News and the Winnipeg Free Press, as well as a multi-part investigative newspaper series published in 2025. Despite large-scale searches and ongoing investigation, her disappearance remains unsolved.

== Description ==
At the time of her disappearance Amber was 24 years old, stood 5'7" (169 cm) tall, weighed 134 lbs (61 kg), and had blonde hair and green eyes. She has been described as having a slender build. She was wearing a black, short-sleeved turtleneck sweater, blue jeans and silver metallic flats. She was carrying a black and white checkered or plaid patterned purse.

== Disappearance ==
On Friday, 17 October 2008, Amber met up with some friends at Smitty's lounge in the west end of Portage la Prairie. Later the group moved to the bar at the Canad Inns, a short distance away, before eventually going to the Cat and Fiddle Nite Club in the Midtown Motor Inn, located in downtown Portage la Prairie. At the Cat and Fiddle, witnesses reported seeing Amber with a former boyfriend, Kelly Garrioch. Amber had a no contact order in place against Garrioch, stemming from an alleged assault 5 months earlier. There was a hearing scheduled for 18 November 2008 where Amber would be called upon to testify against Garrioch, for the 22 May 2008 assault charge and another charge of driving while disqualified. Both charges against Garrioch were later withdrawn because they relied on evidence from Amber, who could not be located. When Amber didn't show up for her scheduled shift at Mark's Work Wearhouse on the morning of Saturday, 18 October 2008, the store phoned Amber's mother. The following morning, Sunday, 19 October 2008, Amber's mother received another call when Amber again failed to show up for her shift. Amber's father reported her missing at the RCMP’s Portage la Prairie detachment the same day. Amber’s Toyota Tercel was found on Saturday, 18 October 2008, in the Canad Inns parking lot where she had left it the previous evening. Investigators stated that there has been no activity with Amber’s cell phone or bank account since her disappearance. In February 2009, investigators released security camera footage from the Midtown Motor Inn beer vendor in Portage la Prairie. The video showed Amber with two men, later identified as Garrioch and Graham Saxon, purchasing a case of beer and leaving together just after 1am on 18 October 2008.

== Investigation ==
=== Search ===
Within days of Amber’s disappearance, friends set up a “Help find Amber McFarland” Facebook group to assist with sharing information and coordinating search efforts. Informal searches by family and friends began almost immediately. The organized search (led by Capt. George Leonard of the Manitoba Search and Rescue Association) commenced on Friday, 24 October 2008, with a reported 164 volunteers conducting a ground search east of the Assiniboine River diversion. K-9 units and a helicopter also assisted on this day. On Saturday, 25 October 2008, 240 volunteers continued the search, along with 14 mounted horses, 12 quads and K-9 units. The search on Sunday, 26 October 2008 concentrated on an area west of the city and near the diversion, and included 115 volunteers, 12 quads, and K-9 units combing through the fields, while two rescue boats scanned along the Assiniboine River. The following week, efforts were focused on the south end of Portage la Prairie, near the diversion, and two ponds were drained. On Saturday, 1 November 2008, busloads of volunteers totaling almost 1,500 turned out to search for both Amber and another missing woman, Jennifer Catcheway, who had disappeared in June 2008. This was reportedly the largest search in Manitoba history. The last major search was held Sunday, 2 November. Altogether, a massive area within 16 km of Portage la Prairie had been covered, but despite diligent efforts, Amber was not found. A candlelight vigil was held Sunday, 21 December 2008, in front of City Hall in Portage la Prairie. The show of support for Amber and Jennifer Catcheway's families drew 200 people, despite frigid temperatures.

=== Arrests ===
On Wednesday, 10 June 2009, nearly 8 months after Amber went missing, the RCMP announced that the case was now a homicide investigation. The same day, new evidence prompted investigators to return to Garrioch's former home on Yellowquill Trail southwest of Portage la Prairie. The team searched inside and outside the home, digging up the backyard, with the Forensic Identification Unit on the scene. The RCMP confirmed that this was the second search of the residence, with the first having taken place in the fall of 2008. Garrioch reportedly sold the home in December 2008, two months after Amber's disappearance. When interviewed by the Winnipeg Free Press on 12 June 2009, Garrioch stated, “I’ve done nothing.”

In July 2009, both men in the security camera footage were arrested. Saxon, 40, was taken into police custody on Wednesday, 8 July 2009, and a search warrant was executed at his home on 4th Street SE in Portage la Prairie the same day. Garrioch, 39, was arrested the following day. Both men were released after questioning, and no charges were laid.

In a statement to the Winnipeg Free Press on Friday, 2 October 2009, Saxon said that he didn't know Amber and had only met her for the first time the evening she went missing. He further stated that after the three left the beer vendor that night, he dropped Garrioch and Amber off at Garrioch's house on Yellowquill Trail, then went home and went to bed. He also said that he had passed a polygraph test and that the RCMP had cleared him as a suspect. When contacted by Amber's friends and relatives in the days following her disappearance, Garrioch admitted that Amber came to his Yellowquill Trail home after they left the beer vendor that night, but claimed that Amber later called someone to pick her up from his place, and he didn't see who it was.

== Media coverage and public attention ==
Amber McFarland's disappearance has received sustained media attention for well over a decade, with repeated coverage by CBC News, the Winnipeg Free Press and other Canadian outlets, particularly on anniversaries of her disappearance. The RCMP have also issued multiple pleas for assistance from the public in their investigation into Amber's disappearance.

The McFarland family participated in the Memorial March for the Murdered and Missing Women of Manitoba, held in Winnipeg on 14 February 2009. They marched again in subsequent years and have continued to support this event and others (such as Red Dress Day) to raise awareness of murdered and missing women in the province.

To honor Amber's 26th birthday in 2010, volunteers put up 300 posters in businesses along the main street in Portage la Prairie.

A candlelight vigil was held at the Island Park Ukrainian Bandstand in Portage la Prairie on 18 October 2018, the 10-year anniversary of Amber's disappearance. The gathering was attended by approximately 80 people. A local musician, Paul Shepherd, wrote the song “Girl Gone Missing” about the disappearances of Amber and Jennifer Catcheway. The song was performed at the vigil, and later included as a track on his 2019 release “Hippie Gone Rogue”. Another local artist, Charlie Brennan, also wrote a song (“Hiding Place”) about the disappearances of Amber and Jennifer Catcheway.

== Current status ==
As of 2026, Amber McFarland's disappearance remains unsolved. Her case is featured on the Manitoba Crime Stoppers website, the MissingKids.ca website, the Doe Network website, and the Canada's Missing website. Amber's story has also been profiled on the MissingPeople.ca, SomeoneSawSomething.ca, and Please Bring Me Home websites. A 3-part series about her case was published in the Graphic Leader and Winnipeg Sun in August/September 2025. Additionally, the “Least of These” podcast covered Amber's case in December 2025.
