= Division No. 1, Subdivision B, Newfoundland and Labrador =

Subdivision 1B
- Unorganized territory
- Division No. 1, Subdivision B
- Location within Newfoundland
- Country: Canada
- Province: Newfoundland and Labrador
- Census division: Division 1

Government
  - MHA: Sherry Gambin-Walsh (LIB, Placentia—St. Mary's)
  - MP: Jonathan Rowe (CON, Terra Nova-The Peninsulas)

Area
  - Land: 460.21 km^{2} (177.69 sq mi)

Population (2016)
  - Total: 360
  - Density: 0.8/km^{2} (2.1/sq mi)
- Time zone: UTC-3:30 (Newfoundland Time)
  - Summer (DST): UTC-2:30 (Newfoundland Daylight)

Division No. 1, Subdivision B is an unorganized subdivision on the Avalon Peninsula in Newfoundland and Labrador, Canada. It is in Division 1 and contains the unorganized communities of Iona, Little Barasway, Placentia Junction, Point Verde and Ship Harbour.

== Iona ==
see: Iona, Newfoundland and Labrador, Canada

== Little Barasway ==
47.178°N 54.041°W Little Barasway is a community on the island of Newfoundland in Newfoundland and Labrador, Canada, approximately 12 km south of Placentia. The name "Little Barasway" is derived from the local pronunciation of the word barachois (a lagoon or harbour sheltered from the sea by a strip of beach). The town name has had many spellings over the years, including Little Barachoix, Little Barrachois, and Little Barrisway. It has never been home to more than a few families in the last 150 years, the names of which include Foley, Doyle, O’Keefe, and McGrath.

Thomas Foley is said to have been the first permanent settler of Little Barasway. A fisherman, he arrived in nearby Placentia circa 1846 to work for Sweetman & Saunders, a firm based out of Waterford, Ireland. The history of the Cape Shore says he was nicknamed Thomas "Tramore" Foley, as he was from Tramore, Ireland.

== Point Verde ==
47°14′N 54°00′W Pointe Verde is a small settlement in Newfoundland and Labrador, Canada. It had 19 families around 1864. The population was 238 in 1956, and 330 in 1986.

Point Verde is located just southwest of Placentia, which is known as the old French capital of Newfoundland. While Placentia was built on a stony beach, Point Verde (Green Point) possesses fine grasslands. One striking feature of Point Verde is the large ponds located near the headland. The two bodies of water used to be joined before a causeway was put in for the road that extends to the point.

The first settlers at Point Verde were John and Robert Greene, who acquired the peninsula from Placentia merchants Saunders and Sweetman in 1803. The Greenes fished and cleared tuckamore to create extensive gardens and pastureland for their livestock. By the time of the first census in 1836, the community had a population of seventy-two.

=== Lighthouse ===
Point Verde Lighthouse
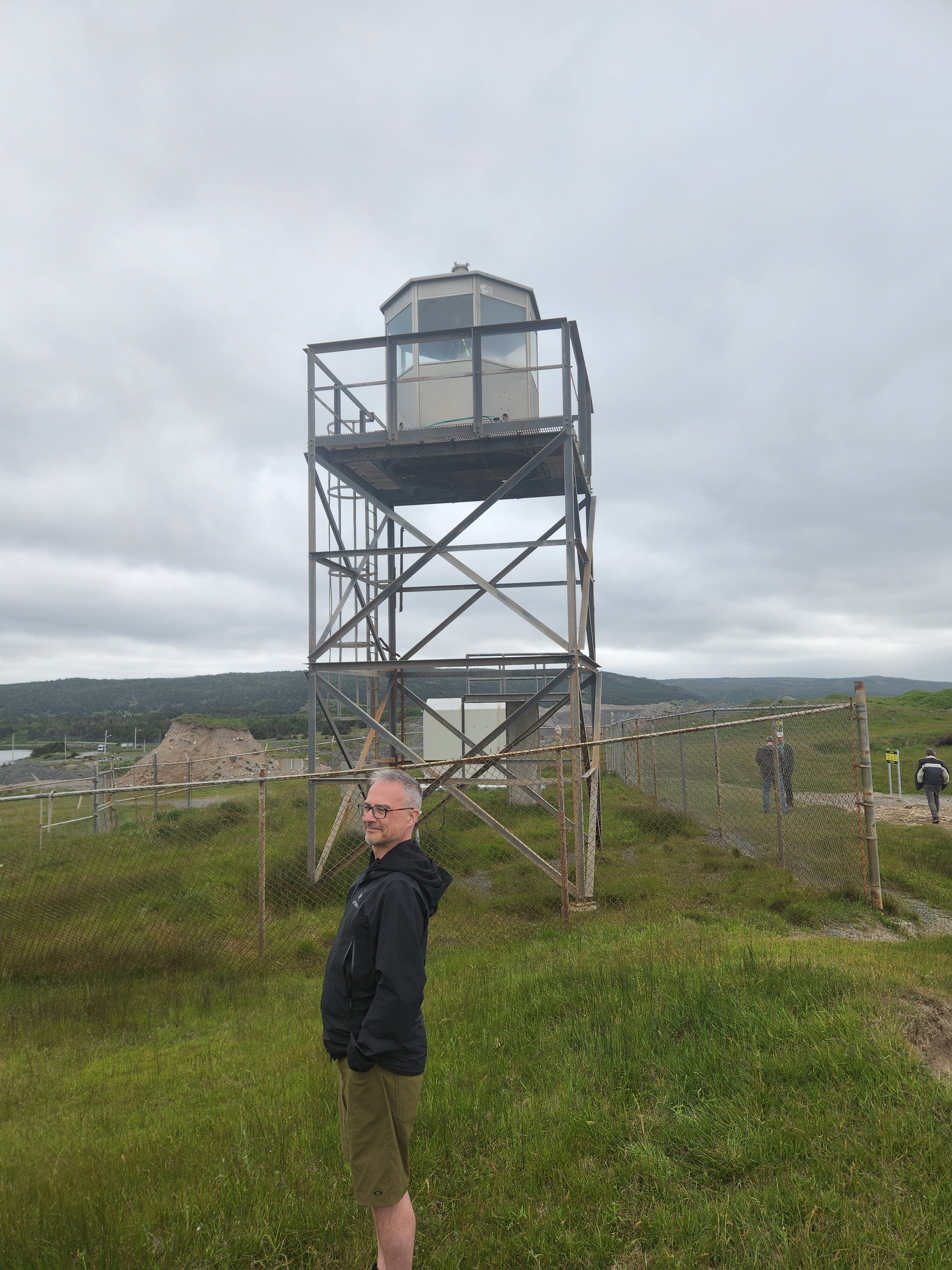
- Point Verde Lighthouse
- Location: Newfoundland, Point Verde, Newfoundland and Labrador, Canada
- Coordinates: 47°14′15″N 54°00′55″W

Tower
- Constructed: 1879 (first); 1920 (second); 1930s (third); 1975 (fourth)
- Foundation: concrete base
- Construction: metal skeletal tower
- Height: 11 m (36 ft)
- Shape: square prism skeletal tower with balcony and lantern
- Markings: grey metallic tower
- Operator: Canadian Coast Guard
- Fog signal: 1 blast every 60s.

Light
- First lit: 1990 (current)
- Focal height: 30 m (98 ft)
- Range: 16 nmi (30 km; 18 mi)
- Characteristic: Fl W 5s

In 1877, a Mr. Dwyer presented a petition to the Newfoundland House of Assembly from C. Irvine and other residents of Placentia and nearby communities calling for a lighthouse at Point Verde. It was noted that the lighthouse would cost about $4,000 and would be very useful for navigation in Placentia Bay and Harbour.

A design for the lighthouse was prepared and executed in 1878, and Point Verde Lighthouse was ready to receive its lantern room by the end of the year, but the lighting material had not arrived from Scotland in time, even though it had been ordered sufficiently early. The first Point Verde Lighthouse consisted of a rectangular, two-story, flat-roofed dwelling set atop a cement foundation with a square tower rising above its roof. A sixth-order lens was used to display a fixed white light at a focal plane of thirty metres.

Before work on constructing the lighthouse began, a short road was built to the nearest beach, and all the necessary material was landed there. In 1886, a bridge was built to access the "Downs," some grassland near the lighthouse, from the main road to Placentia. To access the lighthouse, a road along the beach that was subject to flooding and being obliterated by heavy seas had to be used, as some owners of the "Downs" objected to their property being crossed.

When the Point Verde station was inspected in September 1880, the facing was peeling off the concrete foundation walls, revealing the rottenness within. The worst parts were restored before winter set in that year, and the rest of the repair work was effected the following year.

With its exposed location, Point Verde Lighthouse was buffeted by the winds that accompanied many winter storms. By 1886, iron fastenings had been attached to the tower "to prevent the excessive working that occurs during gales." These fastenings were tightened in 1887 to stabilize the lighthouse. Still, a gale in December 1889 gave the lighthouse a good shaking and blew away the privy.

Erosion has long been a problem at Point Verde. In 1888, Inspector John T. Nevill noted that the sea was gradually encroaching on the bank near the lighthouse and suggested that a certain variety of grass be planted to maintain the face of the bank.

Following the First World War, Augustine "Gus" Greene was appointed lighthouse keeper at Point Verde. He served as the lighthouse keeper through the 1940s and was assisted by James Joseph (Joe) Greene. Joe's son Leonard followed him as assistant lighthouse keeper and then became the main keeper through the 1960s. In 2021, a historical fiction called, "Hannah: The Lighthouse Girl of Newfoundland" which was based on the family of Lighthouse keeper Joe Greene, was published.

At some time during Gus and Joe Greene's service a wooden, square, pyramidal tower, topped by an octagonal lantern room and painted in red and white horizontal stripes, was built on Point Verde. The station's two dwellings and other outbuildings were also painted in the red and white daymark.

In 1975, a 3.7-metre tall, cylindrical fiberglass tower was erected for displaying the light at Point Verde. Besides this tower, a fog signal, and two, one-storey keeper's dwellings were found on the point, and all of these structures were painted with red and white horizontal bands. The lighthouse was staffed until the early 1970s.

A square, steel skeletal tower surmounted by an enclosed lantern room was put in place at Point Verde in 1990. This tower, a fog signal, and a shed, all enclosed in a chain link fence are all that remain on the point.

Keepers
James E. Croucher (1878 – 1897), Thomas Croucher (1898 – at least 1912), James Joseph Greene (Assistant, 1922 - 1945), Gus Greene (1920s-1940s), Leonard Greene (1945 - 1960s), George Thomas (1977 – 1991). Leo McGrath was also a lighthouse keeper at the Point Verde lighthouse from the 1960s to approximately 1982.

== Ship Harbour ==
see: Ship Harbour, Newfoundland and Labrador

== See also ==
- List of lighthouses in Canada
