= John McFarland =

John McFarland may refer to:

- John McFarland (Medal of Honor recipient) (1840–1881)
- John Henry MacFarland (1851–1935), Irish–Australian University Chancellor
- John McFarland (baseball), American baseball player
- John McFarland (ice hockey) (born 1992)
- Sir John McFarland, 1st Baronet (1848-1926) of the McFarland Baronets
- Jack McFarland, fictional character
- John Leslie McFarland, American writer of popular songs
