= James MacFarlane =

New Zealand cricketer

Personal information
- Born: 17 July 1866; Dunedin, Otago, New Zealand
- Died: 11 December 1942 (aged 76); Dunedin, Otago, New Zealand
- Role: Bowler

Domestic team information
- Years: Team
- 1887/88–1889/90: Otago
- 1893/94–1895/96: Canterbury
- Source: ESPNcricinfo, 15 May 2016

James MacFarlane (17 July 1866 – 11 December 1942) was a New Zealand cricketer. He played first-class cricket for Canterbury and Otago between the 1887–88 and 1895–96 seasons.

MacFarlane was born at Dunedin in 1866. Professionally he was employed as a bookmaker. He played for an Otago side of 22 players against a touring Australian side in November 1886 before going on to make his first-class debut for the side during the following season. In four first-class matches for Otago between 1887–88 and 1889–90 and four for Canterbury between 1893–94 and 1895–96, he scored a total of 53 runs and took seven wickets.

MacFarlane died at Dunedin in December 1942. He was aged 76.
