= Charles Harwood =

American politician (1880–1950)

Charles A. Harwood (1880 – October 23, 1950) was an American lawyer and politician from New York, and former Governor of the United States Virgin Islands.

== Life ==
Harwood was born in Brooklyn, New York and attended Hamilton College and New York Law School. He was admitted to the bar in 1904 and practiced law until 1936.

He was a member of the New York State Assembly (Kings Co., 10th D.) in 1910.

In 1936, he was appointed as a Special Assistant to the United States Attorney General, to help prosecute mail fraud cases. From 1937 to 1938, he was a Judge of the United States District Court for the Canal Zone in Panama. He was Governor of the United States Virgin Islands from February 1941 to January 1946.

President Roosevelt sent Harwood's nomination to the Senate on 6 January 1941, and Harwood assumed office on 3 February. The press noted that Harwood was a long-time friend of the president's. Harwood's predecessor, Lawrence William Cramer, had been told to resign by Secretary of the Interior Harold Ickes in December after a controversy. Ickes, who had tagged Congressman Kent Keller for the position, wrote that Harwood called him for the job after consulting with Democratic boss Ed Flynn. By 22 February 1941, Ickes noted in his diary that the appointment had been "a tragic joke."

Virgin Islands historian William Boyer noted that despite being urged to appoint, for the first time, a Negro as island governor, President Franklin D. Roosevelt "chose an old Brooklyn Democrat and former federal judge in the Canal Zone, Charles Harwood, on the recommendation of Bronx political boss Ed Flynn of New York City."

The patronage appointment of Harwood, opposed by many in the Administration, was viewed as the end of the activist New Deal phase of Virgin Islands administration. Harwood's tenure was controversial, and he spent more time in Washington D.C. than in the islands. However, his ability to obtain federal funds increased wartime prosperity. To local disadvantage, Harwood sharply restricted travel between the U.S. and the British Virgin Islands, but under his tenure, the St. Croix air base was constructed.

In August 1945 it was revealed during the investigation of President Roosevelt's son, Elliott Roosevelt's finances in connection with the John Hartford loan scandal that in 1939 Elliott had obtained a loan of $25,000 from Harwood. It was one of many loans Elliott solicited in an attempt to save his foundering radio network. Harwood told Reconstruction Finance Corporation chairman Jesse Jones that he had been promised a federal judgeship for the money, "and, if that was not available, he would take a commission as a general in the Army or in the high brass of the Navy." He was thus disappointed with the governorship, and when Elliott's business went bankrupt, Harwood refused Jesse Jones's offer (on behalf of FDR) to settle the loan for $1,000. Jones and Harwood met on numerous occasions without reaching agreement; instead, Harwood kept the collateral network stock, which Jones had called worthless, and it soon became valuable.

President Harry Truman replaced Charles Harwood with the Virgin Island's first black governor, William H. Hastie. He was a federal attorney first appointed United States Virgin Islands District judge. He married a prominent Native Virgin Islander Beryl Lockhart. Nominated in January, Hastie took office on 18 May 1946.

The highway from the Harry S. Truman Airport to the capital Charlotte Amalie was later named the Charles Harwood Highway. The Charles Harwood Memorial Hospital at Christiansted on St. Croix remains named for the former governor. The former Hospital is now an administrative office.

== Sources ==
- CHARLES HARWOOD, FORMER U. S. AIDE. Special to THE NEW YORK TIMES. New York Times. New York, N.Y.: Oct 24, 1950. pg. 29, 1 pgs
- America's Virgin Islands. William H. Boyer, Carolina Academic Press, Durham, NC, 1983.
- Fifty Billion Dollars. Jesse Jones, MacMillan, New York, 1951.
- Enfant Terrible: The Times and Schemes of General Elliott Roosevelt. Chris Hansen, Able Baker Press, Tucson, 2012.
- The Roosevelt Years. James Farley w. Walter Trohan. McGraw Hill, New York, 1948.
- The Secret Diary of Harold L. Ickes, Vol. 3. Simon and Schuster, New York, 1955.

Preceded by Robert Morss Lovett; Acting	Governor of the U.S. Virgin Islands; 1941–1946	Succeeded by William H. Hastie
