= Bob McFarlane (footballer, born 1887) =

Scottish footballer (1887–1955)

Personal information
- Full name: Robert Angus McFarlane
- Date of birth: 17 January 1887
- Place of birth: Maryhill, Scotland
- Date of death: 12 June 1955 (aged 58)
- Place of death: Clarkston, Scotland
- Height: 1.78 m (5 ft 10 in)
- Position: Inside left

Senior career*
Years	Team	Apps	(Gls)
- Parkhead
1919–1920	Queen's Park	27	(2)
1920–1923	Partick Thistle	55	(14)
1923–1927	Arbroath	75	(27)
1926	→ Dundee United (loan)	2	(0)

International career
	Scotland Schoolboys	3	
- * Club domestic league appearances and goals

Robert Angus McFarlane (17 January 1887 – 12 June 1955) was a Scottish professional footballer who played as an inside left in the Scottish League for Queen's Park, Partick Thistle, Arbroath and Dundee United.

== Personal life ==
Before the First World War, McFarlane worked as a marine engineer in the Glasgow shipyards on the Clyde. As a member of the Royal Naval Volunteer Reserve, he joined the Royal Navy during the war. After the war, McFarlane studied engineering at the Royal Technical College and later went into business in Arbroath. After selling the business, he moved to Bearsden and became District Superintendent with the local council. McFarlane served with the Auxiliary Fire Service during the Second World War and was involved during the Clydebank Blitz.

== Career statistics ==
Appearances and goals by club, season and competition
Club	Season	League			Scottish Cup		Other		Total	
Club	Season	Division	Apps	Goals	Apps	Goals	Apps	Goals	Apps	Goals
Queen's Park	1918–19	Scottish Division One	6	0	—		2 (Note: Appearances in Glasgow Merchants Charity Cup)	1	8	1
Queen's Park	1919–20	Scottish Division One	21	2	0	0	1 (Note: Appearance in Glasgow Cup)	0	22	2
Queen's Park	Total		27	2	0	0	3	1	30	3
Partick Thistle	1919–20	Scottish Division One	9	1	0	0	—		9	1
Partick Thistle	1920–21	Scottish Division One	10	2	4	3	—		14	5
Partick Thistle	1921–22	Scottish Division One	13	2	0	0	—		13	2
Partick Thistle	1922–23	Scottish Division One	19	9	1	0	—		20	9
Partick Thistle	1923–24	Scottish Division One	4	0	—		—		4	0
Partick Thistle	Total		55	14	5	3	—		60	17
Arbroath	1923–24	Scottish Division Two	21	9	2	0	1 (Note: Appearance(s) in Forfarshire Cup)	0	24	9
Arbroath	1924–25	Scottish Division Two	34	15	4	1	2	0	40	16
Arbroath	1925–26	Scottish Division Two	8	2	—		1	0	9	2
Arbroath	1926–27	Scottish Division Two	12	1	1	0	0	0	13	1
Arbroath	Total		75	27	7	1	4	0	86	28
Dundee United (loan)	1925–26	Scottish Division One	2	0	3	0	—		5	0
Career total			159	43	15	4	7	1	181	48

== Honours ==
Arbroath

- Forfarshire Cup: 1923–24
