= William McFarlane =

William McFarlane may refer to:

- Will C. Macfarlane (1870-1945), American composer, choirmaster, and organist
- Willie Macfarlane (1890–1961), Scottish golfer
- Willie McFarlane (athlete), winner of the New Year Sprint in 1933 and 1934
- Willie MacFarlane (footballer, born 1930) (1930–2010), Scottish football player and manager (Hibernian)
- William McFarlane (1890s footballer), played for Port Vale FC in 1893
- William D. McFarlane (1894–1980), United States Representative from Texas
- Willie McFarlane (1923–1998), Scottish football player (Heart of Midlothian)

== See also ==
- William McFarland (disambiguation)
