= McFarlane =

McFarlane may refer to:

- McFarlane (surname)
- McFarlane Toys, a toy manufacturer

== See also ==
- McFarlane's Evil Prophecy, a 2004 video game
- McFarlan, a surname
- McFarlin, a surname
- MacFarlane (disambiguation)
