= Paul-Matthieu Grondin =

Canadian lawyer

Paul-Matthieu Grondin is a Canadian lawyer and a former bâtonnier (elected leader) of the Bar of Quebec. He has law degrees from the University of Sherbrooke and Queen's University.

In the election for the position, he received 8,400 votes out of 11,679, defeating former bâtonnière (the feminine of bâtonnier) Lu Chan Khuong and replacing the previous bâtonnière, Claudia Prémont. He was elected in May 2017 and took office for a two-year term in June 2017.
