= Ian Macfarlane =

Ian Macfarlane may refer to:

- Ian Macfarlane (economist) (born 1946), Australian economist, governor of the Reserve Bank of Australia, 1996–2006
- Ian MacFarlane (footballer, born 1933) (1933–2019), Scottish football player and manager
- Ian MacFarlane (footballer, born 1968), Scottish football player
- Ian Macfarlane (politician) (born 1955), Australian politician

== See also ==
- Ian McFarlane (born 1959), Australian music journalist
- Ian McFarlane (literary scholar) (1915–2002), British scholar of French literature
- Ian Macfarlan (1881–1964), Australian politician
