= Ship Harbour, Newfoundland and Labrador =

Ship Harbour
- Fishing Town
- Location of Ship Harbour in Newfoundland
- Coordinates: 47°21′36.35″N 53°54′09.67″W
- Country: Canada
- Province: Newfoundland and Labrador
- Census division: Division 1
- Census subdivision: Subdivision B

Population (2001)
  - Total: 200
- Time zone: UTC-3:30 (Newfoundland Time)
  - Summer (DST): UTC-2:30 (Newfoundland Daylight)
- Area code: 709
- Highways: Route 102

Ship Harbour is a community in Newfoundland and Labrador, Canada located on the eastern shore of Placentia Bay.

Adjacent to Argentia, the waters off Ship Harbour are best known as the site of Atlantic Conference between Winston Churchill and Franklin D. Roosevelt on August 14, 1941. While HMS Prince of Wales and USS Augusta were secretly anchored in the entrance off Ship Harbour, various dignitaries and the two heads of government discussed the terms of what would become known as the Atlantic Charter. The community has a site dedicated to the meeting and also has a museum located in the Community Center.

Ship Harbour has a population of about 200 people. It is 140 kilometres (87 mi) west of St. John's and can be reached on the Trans-Canada Highway and exiting at the Argentia Access Road.

== History ==
Ship Harbour has been settled since at least 1835 when it was included in the Argentia Parish. By 1845 there were 2 families of 13 people, and the community did not appear again until 1869 when the population moved upward to 38 (two of the residents being born in Ireland). In the census of 1874 with 6 families and in 1884 it boasted 116 people. By the turn of the century there were four lobster factories operating in Ship Harbour and some salmon was tinned. Merchant Alberto Wareham outfitted local fishermen for the lobster and herring fisheries. In the 1921 Almanac of Newfoundland Edward Power is listed as the Post Master in Ship Harbour. Through oral history he is said to have operated out of his home. Ship Harbour's major surnames include Griffin, Griffiths, Sparrow, Power, Meade, Newman, Norman, Ledwell, and Upshall.

== Education and religion ==
By 1884, there was a school built according to the census that year. In 1891 a Roman Catholic church was built. By the early 1900s the one-room school-house built before 1884 was still in use with a Ms. Mary Sullivan as the school's only teacher. The community hall was once Little Flower School, that had been built in 1946. When the school was closed, portable classrooms were set up down the road at another site. In 1966 the first group of high school students were bussed to Fox Harbour, a community 12 kilometres (7.5 mi) away. Two years later a new high school opened in Placentia and both Ship Harbour and Fox Harbour students went to Laval High School. Presentation Sisters taught girls in one wing and Irish Christian Brothers taught boys in the other wing of Laval High School. In 1986 the portable school was permanently closed in Ship Harbour and all students, to this day are bussed to Dunville to St. Anne's Academy for kindergarten to Grade 6 and to Placentia for Grade 7 to Grade 12.

== See also ==
- Swells Cove
