= McFarland, Missouri =

Extinct hamlet in Missouri, U.S.

Coordinates: 36°42′38″N 93°05′21″W

McFarland is an extinct town in Taney County, in the U.S. state of Missouri. The community was on Swan Creek approximately two miles north of Forsyth.

A post office called McFarland was established in 1901, and remained in operation until 1911. The community has the name of one Mr. McFarland, the original owner of the town site.
