= Lorne Sossin =

Canadian judge

Lorne Sossin is a justice of the Court of Appeal for Ontario. Before his appointment to the Court of Appeal, Sossin was a judge of the Ontario Superior Court of Justice and a law professor.

Sossin has an LLB from Osgoode Hall Law School and graduate degrees in political science and law, respectively, from the University of Toronto and Columbia University. From 2002 to 2018, he was a professor of law at the University of Toronto Faculty of Law and Osgoode Hall Law School. He was appointed to the Superior Court of Justice in 2018 and to the Court of Appeal in November 2020.

== Notable cases ==
While a judge of the Superior Court, Sossin held that a lawsuit alleging that various Canadian retailers including Canadian Tire had violated animal cruelty legislation could not go forward for lack of standing. Sossin ruled against the city of Toronto in a lawsuit alleging that the city failed to implement appropriate social distancing in shelters for city residents experiencing homelessness during the COVID-19 pandemic in Ontario.
