= James Macfarlan =

Scottish poet (1832–1862)

James Macfarlan (9 April 1832 – 6 November 1862) was a Scottish poet. He published a few volumes of poetry in his lifetime, while living usually as a pedlar.

== Life ==
Macfarlan was born in Glasgow on 9 April 1832, son of Andrew Macfarlan, a weaver turned pedlar from County Tyrone, and his wife Margaret Marshall. He received some education in Kilmarnock and Glasgow, but was mainly self-taught. Inspired by a stray volume of Lord Byron when about twelve years old, he borrowed books from public libraries in various towns visited in the wanderings of the family, and by the age of twenty he had read widely.

In 1853, having collected pieces he had written, he walked to and from London and secured the publication of a volume of poetry by subscription. The book, Poems (1854), received favourable reviews but made no money. For a short time subsequently he held a post in the Glasgow Athenæum, but returned to peddling. He printed in Glasgow a second book, City Songs (1855), dedicated to George Howard, 7th Earl of Carlisle, but, although it was well received by critics, he received little encouragement either from his patron or from the public.

Macfarlan was in poor health and was destitute; he obtained and soon lost another job. He was engaged as police-court reporter to the Glasgow Bulletin. Too erratic for this post, he successfully contributed short stories for a time to the weekly issue of the paper.

On 3 August 1855 he married Agnes Miller; they had four children. His wife helped the income by dressmaking. Charles Dickens printed several of his poems in Household Words; Macfarlan called him "a prince of editors". William Makepeace Thackeray, hearing Samuel Lover recite his Lords of Labour in 1859, exclaimed: "I don't think Burns himself could have taken the wind out of this man's sails".

Macfarlan suffered from tuberculosis; in October 1862 he collapsed after a day trying to sell his prose pamphlet, An Attic Study. He died in Glasgow on 6 November 1862, and was buried in Cheapside cemetery, Anderston, Glasgow.

Colin Rae-Brown, a director of the Bulletin, later wrote that Macfarlan "appeared a perfect riddle. He seemed to possess two separate and distinct individualities: one soaring high in the sunny empyrean of the sacred Nine, the other grovelling in the dingiest purlieus of the populous 'City by the Clyde.'"

== Works ==
Macfarlan does not write in the Scottish dialect, but in fluent and resonant English. He shows originality and elevation of thought. His works are:

- Poems: Pictures of the Past, 1854
- City Songs, and other Poetical Pieces, 1855
- Lyrics of Life, 1856

Subsequently he published two tracts, The Wanderers of the West, a poem, and a series of acute and suggestive prose reflections, entitled An Attic Study; brief Notes on Nature, Men, and Books.

The Poetical Works of James Macfarlan, with a Memoir, appeared in 1882.
