= Robert Macfarlan (schoolmaster) =

Scottish schoolmaster, writer, journalist and translator (1734-1804)

Robert Macfarlan (also Macfarlane) (1734–1804) was a Scottish schoolmaster, notable as a writer, journalist and translator.

== Life ==
Macfarlan was educated at the University of Edinburgh, where he proceeded M.A. He settled in London, and for some years kept a successful school at Walthamstow, Essex. It was at Shern Lodge, also called Shernhall House, and he ran it from about 1770 to about 1795, when he left Walthamstow. His pupils included Robert Plumer Ward.

At one time Macfarlane was editor of the Morning Chronicle and London Packet. He reported, from memory, some of the major speeches in parliament during Lord North's administration, in particular from those delivered in the debates on the American War of Independence. In 1792 he was employed by the Highland Society of Scotland as a teacher of Scottish Gaelic.

On the evening of 8 August 1804, during the Brentford election, Macfarlan was killed by an accidental fall under a carriage, at Hammersmith.

== Works ==
Marfarlan was engaged by Thomas Evans the publisher, of Paternoster Row, to write a History of the Reign of George III, the first volume of which was issued in 1770. Evans then fell out with him, and employed another writer to continue the work, the second volume of which appeared in 1782, and the third in 1794. Reconciled to Evans, Macfarlan wrote in 1796 a fourth volume, which was severely handled by the critics. Macfarlan defended himself in an Appendix, or the Criticks Criticized, London, 1797. His account of the king's mental state was frank, by the public standards of the time.

Macfarlan translated the poems of Ossian into Latin verse, publishing in 1769 the first book of Temora. At the time of his death he had in the press a major Ossian edition. It was later issued by the Highland Society of London as The Poems of Ossian in Gaelic, 3 vols. London, 1807. With a literal translation into Latin, there were: a dissertation on the authenticity of the poems by Sir John Sinclair; and a translation from the Italian of Melchiore Cesarotti's Dissertation on the Controversy respecting Ossian, with notes, by John McArthur. Macfarlan's translation of Benjamin Franklin's The Way to Wealth into Gaelic was published along with Donald Macintosh's Gaelic Proverbs and Familiar Phrases in 1785. In 1795 Macfarlan published A New Alphabetical Vocabulary, Gailic and English.

In 1797 Macfarlan published An Address to the People of the British Empire on Public Affairs. In 1799 his translation from Latin of George Buchanan's Dialogue concerning the Rights of the Crown of Scotland appeared. It had two dissertations prefixed to it: one on the supposed identity of the Getae and Scythians and the Goths and Scots; and the other vindicating the character of Buchanan as an historian. The antiquarian material bore on the current debate with Malcolm Laing and John Pinkerton, on the validity of Ossian, Celticism and Gothicism. The Buchanan translation's relevance, however, was just as much to the politics of the French Revolution; and Macfarlan saw Buchanan as "the father of politics in modern Europe". The British Critic in 1801 found the translation "of a dangerous tendency".

== Notes ==
Attribution

This article incorporates text from a publication now in the public domain: Lee, Sidney, ed. (1893). "Macfarlane, Robert (1734-1804)". Dictionary of National Biography. Vol. 35. London: Smith, Elder & Co.
