= McFarlan =

McFarlan is a surname. Notable people with the surname include:

- Alex McFarlan (1869–1939), American baseball player
- Dan McFarlan (1873–1924), American baseball player
- Duncan McFarlan (died 1816), American politician

== See also ==
- McFarlan, North Carolina, city in North Carolina, United States
- McFarlan Automobile, American automobile
- Macfarlan (disambiguation)
- MacFarlane (disambiguation)
- McFarlane (disambiguation)
