= McFarlin =

McFarlin is a surname. Notable people with the surname include:

- Diane McFarlin, American journalist and newspaper publisher
- Ivan McFarlin (born 1982), American basketball player
- Robert J. McFarlin (1929-2017), American politician
- Robert M. McFarlin (1866–1942), American businessman

== See also ==
- McFarlin Memorial Auditorium, theater in Texas, United States
- McFarlin Building, historic building in Tulsa, Oklahoma
