= Robert H. McFarland =

American judge (1919–2008)

Robert H. McFarland (February 25, 1919 – March 31, 2008) was a judge of the United States District Court for the Canal Zone from 1978 to 1979.

== Early life, military service, and education ==
Born in Bay Springs, Mississippi, McFarland attended Bay Springs High School and served in the United States Army during World War II, stationed in Texas. After the war, he received his law degree at the University of Mississippi School of Law, and entered the practice of law in Bay Springs, Mississippi in 1947. He was chairman of the Mississippi Oil and Gas Board from 1962 to 1970.

== Judicial service ==
On June 20, 1978, President Jimmy Carter announced the nomination of McFarland to the seat. The nomination was praised by Mississippi members of the U.S. Senate John C. Stennis and James Eastland, with Eastland describing McFarland as a longtime friend, though a regional NAACP official called for the withdrawal of the appointment based on a report that McFarland had once chaired a White Citizen's Council in Jasper County, Georgia. Despite this objection, McFarland was confirmed by the Senate on July 10, 1978.

McFarland served until July 1979, two months after his oldest daughter died from complications from juvenile diabetes; McFarland lamented that he and his wife were unable to be with his daughter during the last several months of her life due to the obligations of his office, and desired to thereafter stay closer to their other three children. Following McFarland's resignation it was expected that the seat would remain vacant until the next administration, but the court was abolished in 1982 without another judge being appointed to the seat.

== Personal life and death ==
While stationed in Texas, McFarland met Susan Showfield, whom he married in 1947, and with whom he had two daughters and two sons. McFarland died of heart failure at Jasper General Hospital at the age of 89.

Political offices
Preceded by Guthrie F. Crowe	Judge of the United States District Court for the Canal Zone; 1978–1979	Succeeded by Seat abolished
