= Macfarlan, West Virginia =

Macfarlan
- Unincorporated community
- Location within the state of West Virginia Macfarlan (the United States)
- Coordinates: 39°4′40″N 81°11′55″W
- Country: United States
- State: West Virginia
- County: Ritchie
- Time zone: UTC-5 (Eastern (EST))
  - Summer (DST): UTC-4 (EDT)
- ZIP codes: 26148

Macfarlan (also MacFarlan) is an unincorporated community in southwestern Ritchie County, West Virginia, United States. It lies along West Virginia Route 47 southwest of the town of Harrisville, the county seat of Ritchie County. Its elevation is 653 feet (199 m). It has a post office with the ZIP code 26148.

The community was named after a pioneer named by Macfarlan whose party was attacked by Indians near the town site.

The community is the inspiration for the 1897 piano solo by Wirt W. Cain, Macfarlan Waltz.
