= Jean L. MacFarland =

Canadian judge

Jean L. MacFarland is a justice of the Court of Appeal for Ontario, appointed November 19, 2004. She is a 1971 graduate of Queen's University Faculty of Law. She also previously served on the Ontario Superior Court of Justice.
