= Luchins =

Luchins is a surname. Notable people with the surname include:

- Abraham S. Luchins (1914–2005), American psychologist
- David Luchins (born 1946), American political scientist
- Edith Hirsch Luchins (1921–2002), Polish-American mathematician, wife of Abraham

== See also ==
- Srdjan Luchin (born 1986), Romanian footballer
