= Einstellung effect =

Development of a mechanized state of mind

Einstellung (German pronunciation: [ˈaɪ̯nˌʃtɛlʊŋ]; German: Einstellungseffekt) is the development of a mechanized state of mind. Often called a problem solving set, Einstellung refers to a person's predisposition to solve a given problem in a specific manner even though better or more appropriate methods of solving the problem exist.

The Einstellung effect is the negative effect of previous experience when solving new problems. The Einstellung effect has been tested experimentally in many different contexts.

The example which led to the coining of the term by Abraham S. Luchins and Edith Hirsch Luchins is the Luchins water jar experiment, in which subjects were asked to solve a series of water jar problems. After solving many problems which had the same solution, subjects applied the same solution to later problems even though a simpler solution existed (Luchins, 1942). Other experiments on the Einstellung effect can be found in The Effect of Einstellung on Compositional Processes and Rigidity of Behavior, A Variational Approach to the Effect of Einstellung.

== Background ==
Einstellung literally means "setting" or "installation" as well as a person's "attitude" in German. Related to Einstellung is what is referred to as an Aufgabe ("task" in German). The Aufgabe is the situation which could potentially invoke the Einstellung effect. It is a task which creates a tendency to execute a previously applicable behavior. In the Luchins and Luchins experiment a water jar problem served as the Aufgabe, or task.

The Einstellung effect occurs when a person is presented with a problem or situation that is similar to problems they have worked through in the past. If the solution (or appropriate behavior) to the problem/situation has been the same in each past experience, the person will likely provide that same response, without giving the problem too much thought, even though a more appropriate response might be available. Essentially, the Einstellung effect is one of the human brain's ways of finding an appropriate solution/behavior as efficiently as possible. The detail is that though finding the solution is efficient, the solution itself is not or might not be. (This is consistent with the famous remark of Blaise Pascal: "I would have written a shorter letter, but I didn't have the time.")

Another phenomenon similar to Einstellung is functional fixedness (Duncker 1945). Functional fixedness is an impaired ability to discover a new use for an object, owing to the subject's previous use of the object in a functionally dissimilar context. It can also be deemed a cognitive bias that limits a person to using an object only in the way it is traditionally used. Duncker also pointed out that the phenomenon occurs not only with physical objects, but also with mental objects or concepts (a point which lends itself nicely to the phenomenon of Einstellung effect).

== Luchins and Luchins water jar experiment ==
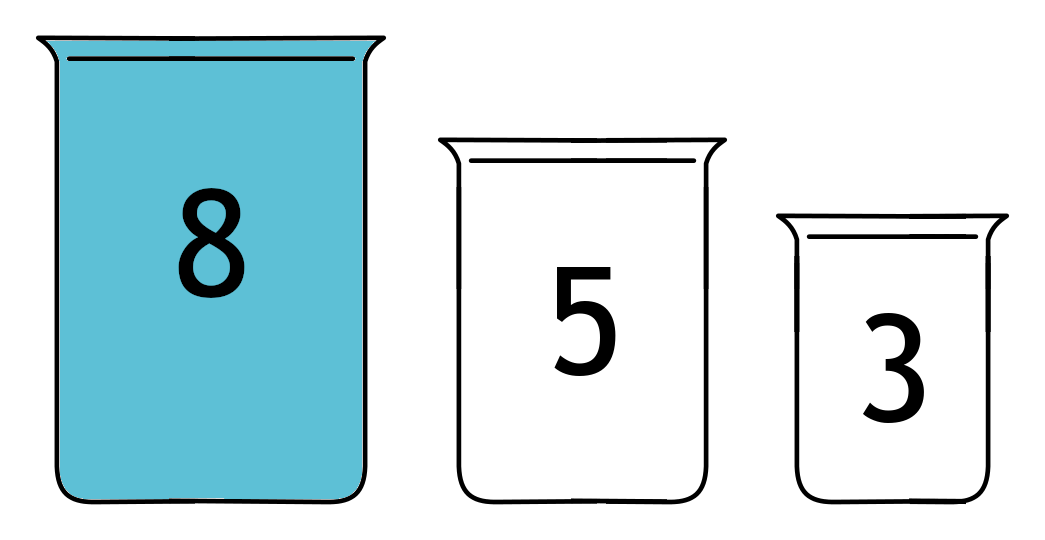
An example water jar puzzle: a jug filled with 8 units of water, and two empty jugs of sizes 5 and 3. The solver must pour the water in such a way that the first and second jugs end up containing 4 units, and the third is empty.

The water jar test, first described in Abraham S. Luchins's 1942 classic experiment, is a commonly cited example of an Einstellung situation. The experiment's participants were given the following problem: there are 3 water jars, each with the capacity to hold a different, fixed amount of water; the subject must figure out how to measure a certain amount of water using these jars. It was found that subjects used methods that they had used previously to find the solution even though there were quicker and more efficient methods available. The experiment shines light on how mental sets can hinder the solving of novel problems.

In the Luchins' experiment, subjects were divided into two groups. The experimental group was given five practice problems, followed by four critical test problems. The control group did not have the five practice problems. All of the practice problems and some of the critical problems had only one solution, which was "B minus A minus 2⋅C." For example, one is given jar A capable of holding 21 units of water, B capable of holding 127, and C capable of holding 3. If an amount of 100 units must be measured out, the solution is to fill up jar B and pour out enough water to fill A once and C twice.

One of the critical problems was called the extinction problem. The extinction problem was a problem that could not be solved using the previous solution B − A − 2C. In order to answer the extinction problem correctly, one had to solve the problem directly and generate a novel solution. An incorrect solution to the extinction problem indicated the presence of the Einstellung effect. The problems after the extinction problem again had two possible solutions. These post-extinction problems helped determine the recovery of the subjects from the Einstellung effect.

The critical problems could be solved using this solution (B − A − 2C) or a shorter solution (A − C or A + C). For example, subjects were instructed to get 18 units of water from jars with capacities 15, 39, and 3. Despite the presence of a simpler solution (A + C), subjects in the experimental group tended to give the lengthier solution in lieu of the shorter one. Instead of simply filling up Jars A and C, most subjects from the experimental group preferred the previous method of B − A − 2C, whereas virtually all of the control group used the simpler solution. When Luchins and Luchins gave experimental group subjects the warning, "Don't be blind", over half of them used the simplest solution to the remaining problems.

== Explanations and interpretations ==
The Einstellung effect can be supported by theories of inductive reasoning. In a nutshell, inductive reasoning is the act of inferring a rule based on a finite number of instances. Most experiments on human inductive reasoning involve showing subjects a card with an object (or multiple objects, or letters, etc.) on it. The objects can vary in number, shape, size, color, etc., and the subject's job is to answer (initially by guessing) "yes" or "no" whether (or not) the card is a positive instance of the rule (which must be inferred by the subject). Over time, the subjects do tend to learn the rule, but the question is how? Kendler and Kendler (1962) proposed that older children and adults tend to exhibit noncontinuity theory; that is, the subjects tend to pick a reasonable rule and assume it to be true until it proves false. Regarding the Einstellung effect, one can view noncontinuity theory as a way of explaining the tendency to maintain a specific behavior until it fails to work. In the water-jar problem, subjects generated a specific rule because it seemed to work in all situations; when they were given problems for which the same solution worked, but a better solution was possible, they still gave their 'tried and true' response. Where theories of inductive reasoning tend to diverge from the idea of the Einstellung effect is when analyzing the fact that, even after an instance where the Einstellung rule failed to work, many subjects reverted to the old solution when later presented with a problem for which it did work (again, this problem also had a better solution). One way to explain this observation is that in actuality subjects know (consciously) that the same solution might not always work, yet since they were presented with so many instances where it did work, they still tend to test that solution before any other (and so if it works, it will be the first solution found).

Neurologically, the idea of synaptic plasticity, which is an important neurochemical explanation of memory, can help to understand the Einstellung effect. Specifically, Hebbian theory (which in many regards is the neuroscience equivalent of original associationist theories) is one explanation of synaptic plasticity (Hebb, 1949). It states that when two associated neurons frequently fire together – while infrequently firing apart from one another – the strength of their association tends to become stronger (making future stimulation of one neuron even more likely to stimulate the other). Since the frontal lobe is most often attributed with the roles of planning and problem solving, if there is a neurological pathway which is fundamental to the understanding of the Einstellung effect, the majority of it most likely falls within the frontal lobe. Essentially, a Hebbian explanation of Einstellung could be as follows: stimuli are presented in such a way that the subject recognizes themself as being in a situation which they have been in before. That is, the subject sees, hears, smells, etc., an environment which is akin to an environment which they have been in before. The subject then must process the stimuli which are presented in such a way that they exhibit a behavior which is appropriate for the situation (be it run, throw, eat, etc.). Because neural growth is, at least in part, due to the associations between two events/ideas, it follows that the more a given stimulus is followed by a specific response, the more likely in the future that stimulus will invoke the same response. Regarding the Luchins' experiment, the stimulus presented was a water-jar problem (or to be more technical, the stimulus was a piece of paper which had words and numbers on it which, when interpreted correctly, portray a water-jar problem) and the invoked response was B − A − 2C. While it is a bit of a stretch to assume that there is a direct connection between a water-jar problem and B − A − 2C within the brain, it is not unreasonable to assume that the specific neural connections which are active during a water-jar problem-state and those that are active when one thinks "take the second term, subtract the first term, then subtract two of the third term" tend to increase in the amount of overlap as more and more instances where B − A − 2C works are presented.

== Other Einstellung research ==
=== Psychological stress ===
The following experiments were designed to gauge the effect of different stressful situations on the Einstellung effect. Overall, these experiments show that stressful situations increase the prevalence of the Einstellung effect.

==== The speed test ====
Luchins gave an elementary-school class a set of water jar problems. In order to create a stressful situation, experimenters told the students that the test would be timed, that the speed and accuracy of the test would be reviewed by their principal and teachers, and that the test would affect their grades. To further agitate the students during the test, experimenters were instructed to comment on how much slower the children were compared to children in lower grades. The experimenters observed anxious, stressed, and sometimes tearful faces during the experiment. (Note that while such methods were common in the 1950s, today it violates ethical practices in research.)

The results of the experiment indicated that the stressful speed test situation increased rigidity. Luchins found that only three of the ninety-eight students tested were able to solve the extinction problem, and only two students used the direct method for the critical problems. The same experiment conducted under non-stress conditions showed 70% rigidity during the test problems and 58% failure of the extinction problem, while the anxiety-inducing situation showed 98% and 97% respectively.

The speed test was performed with college students as well, which yielded similar results. Even when college students were told ahead of time to use the direct method in order to avoid mistakes made by children, the college students continued to exhibit rigidity under time pressure. The results of these studies showed that the emphasis on speed increased the Einstellung effect on the water jar problems.

==== Maze tracing ====
Luchins also instructed subjects to draw a solution through a maze without crossing any of the maze's lines. The maze was either traced normally or traced using the mirror reflection of the maze. If the subject drew over the lines of the figure, they had to start at the beginning, which was disadvantageous since the subject was told that their score depended on the time and smoothness of the solution. The mirror-tracing situation was the stressful situation, and the normal tracing was the non-stressful, control situation. Experimenters observed that the mirror-tracing task caused more drawing outside the boundaries, increased overt signs of stress and anxiety, and required more time to accurately complete. The mirror-tracing situation produced 89% Einstellung solution on the first two criticals instead of the 71% observed for normal tracing. In addition, 55% of the subjects failed with the mirror while only 18% failed without the mirror.

==== Hidden word test for stutterers ====
In 1951, Solomon gave both stutterers and fluent speakers a hidden word test, an arithmetical test, and a mirror maze test. Experimenters called the hidden word test a "speech test" to increase stutterer anxiety. There were no marked differences between the stutterers and the fluent speakers for the arithmetical and mirror maze tests. However, the results reveal a significant difference between the performance of the stutterers and the fluent speakers on the "speech test". On the first two critical problems, 58 percent of the stutterers gave Einstellung solutions whereas only 4 percent of the fluent speakers showed Einstellung effects.

=== Age ===
The original Luchins and Luchins experiment tested nine-, ten-, eleven-, and twelve-year-olds for the Einstellung effect. The older groups showed more Einstellung effects than the younger groups in general. However, this initial study did not control for differences in educational level and intelligence.

To remedy this problem, Ross (1952) conducted a study on middle-aged (mean 37.3 years) and older adults (mean 60.8 years). The adults were grouped according to the I.Q., years of schooling, and occupation. Ross administered five Einstellung tests including the arithmetical (water jar) test, the maze test, the hidden word test, and two other tests. For every test, the middle-aged group performed better than the older group. For example, 65% of the older adults failed the extinction task of the arithmetical test, whereas only 29% of the middle-aged adults failed the extinction problem.

Luchins devised another experiment to determine the difference between Einstellung effects in children and in adults. In this study, 140 fifth-graders (mean 10.5 years) were compared to 79 college students (mean 21 years) and 21 adults (mean 43 years). Einstellung effects prior to the extinction task increased with age: the observed Einstellung effects for the extinction task were 56, 68, and 69 percent for young adults, children, and older adults respectively. This implies that there exists a curvilinear relationship between age and the recovery from the Einstellung effect. A similar experiment conducted by Heglin in 1955, also found this relationship when the three age groups were equated for IQ.

Therefore, the initial manifestation of the Einstellung effect on the arithmetic test increases with age. However, the recovery from the Einstellung effect is greatest for young adults (average age 21 years) and decreases as the subject moves away from this age.

=== Gender ===
In Luchins and Luchins' original experiment with 483 children, they found that boys demonstrated less of an Einstellung effect than girls. The experimental difference was only significant for the group that was instructed to write "Don't be blind" on their papers after the sixth problem (the DBB group). "Don't be blind" was meant as a reminder to pay attention and guard against rigidity for the sixth problem. However, this message was interpreted in many different ways including thinking of the message as just some more words to remember. The alternative interpretations occurred more frequently in girls and increased with IQ score within the female group. This difference in interpretation of "don't be blind" may account for the fact that the male DBB group showed more direct solutions than their female counterparts.

To determine sex differences in adults, Luchins gave college students the maze Einstellung test. The results were inconclusive. Other studies have provided conflicting data about the sex differences in the Einstellung effect.

=== Intelligence ===
Luchins and Luchins looked at the relationship between the intelligence quotient (IQ) and the Einstellung effects for the children in their original experiment. They found that there was a statistically insignificant relationship between the Einstellung effect and intelligence. In general, large Einstellung effects were observed for all subject groups regardless of IQ score. When Luchins and Luchins looked at the IQ range for children who did and did not demonstrate Einstellung effects, they spanned from 51 to 160 and from 75 to 155 respectively. These ranges show a slight negative correlation between intelligence and Einstellung effects.

== See also ==
- Anchoring (cognitive bias)
- Cognitive inertia
- Rigidity (psychology)
- Beginner's mind (antonym)
- (Einstellung effect as a) wrong working hypothesis
- Functional fixedness and the candle problem
- Law of the instrument
- Missing square puzzle (a typical Einstellung effect)
- Thinking outside the box
- XY problem
