= Sam Glucksberg =

Canadian psychologist (1933–2022)

- Born: February 6, 1933; Montreal, Quebec, Canada
- Died: August 29, 2022 (aged 89); New York City, U.S.
- Education: City College of New York (B.S. in Psychology); New York University (PhD)
- Known for: Research in figurative language, candle problem
- Scientific career
- Fields: Psychology
- Workplaces: Princeton University, New Jersey

Sam Glucksberg (February 6, 1933 – August 29, 2022) was a Canadian professor in the Psychology Department at Princeton University in New Jersey, known for his works on figurative language: metaphors, irony, sarcasm, and idioms. He is particularly known for manipulating the Candle Problem experiment which had participants figure out the best way to erect a candle on a wall. Along with performing experiments, Glucksberg also wrote Understanding Figurative Language: From Metaphors to Idioms, published by Oxford University Press in 2001.

== Biography ==
Glucksberg was born February 6, 1933, in Montreal, Quebec. He received his B.S. in psychology in 1956 at City College of New York, magna cum laude. He then received his Ph.D. in experimental psychology with distinction at New York University in 1960. After a period of three years as a research psychologist at the U.S. Army Human Engineering Laboratories, he came to Princeton as an instructor in 1963, and rose progressively through the ranks, being appointed full professor in 1970. He was chairman of the Department of Psychology from 1974-80.

== Academic career ==
Glucksberg was interested in how people use and understand language in everyday life, specifically in the areas of metaphors, irony, sarcasm, and idioms. These are areas in the psychology of language that are not widely covered. Glucksberg set out to understand how people recognize and understand these parts of figurative speech. He wanted to learn if people can respond to figurative speech with the same speed as literal speech. He also focused time and research in areas of language comprehension. In this area he concentrated on the context of communication and figuring out if the context determines whether one comprehends or if one can comprehend without knowing the context of the conversation. Referential communication was another aspect of language Glucksberg researched on and specifically how it affects young children.

== Metaphors ==
Metaphors like "Lawyers are sharks" enable us to create novel categories that allow us to characterize the topic of interest. In this case we use "shark" as a metaphorical category and apply the vicious and predatory sense of the animal to lawyers. This enables us to have a direct link between lawyer and shark allowing us to create a mental picture. The standard pragmatic view states that understanding metaphors requires a three-stage process. The first step is to figure out the literal meaning of a sentence. For the example "lawyers are sharks" one would derive the meaning "lawyers are a fish in the ocean", which makes no sense. The second stage addresses this interpretation against the context of utterance. Because it makes no sense in context, we then go to the third step which searches for a nonliteral meaning that does make sense. When the literal meaning violates one of Grice's rules of conversation it then becomes defective and becomes a false statement. This statement then has to be rejected and replaced with a non-literal interpretation. This model shows that non-literal meanings are secondary and literal meanings are automatic.

Glucksberg argued and showed that non-literal meanings can be comprehended as easily as literal meanings. It is not dependent on failure to find a literal meaning but instead a mandatory and automatic process. He proved that non-literal meaning is comprehended just as easily as literal meaning in his experiment where he had participants listen to metaphors like "Jerry first knew that loneliness was a desert* when he was very young." While listening, target words would appear, and participants had to decide whether or not they were words. For the example above, there were three different types of target words, metaphorical, literal, and control. The words that corresponded with these categories were "isolate", "sand", and "mustache". The findings showed that participants were faster with metaphorical and literal target words than they were with the control words. In the next experiment he showed that metaphors are understood directly as categorical assertions. This experiment was modeled after Stroop's classic experiment that people cannot ignore literal meanings. In this well-known experiment, color words were presented in a different color than the word (for example the word "red" would be in the color green) and participants were asked to say the color of the ink. They had difficulty saying green when the word red was printed, meaning they could not inhibit reading words that are attended. Glucksberg applied this knowledge to literally false but metaphorically true sentences. Participants were shown sentences one at a time and then told to determine whether or not they were literally true or false. There were four different types of sentences used, literally true, literally false, metaphors, and scrambled metaphors (metaphors that make no sense). If metaphorical meanings were ignored, then people should reject them at the same speed they do for the scrambled metaphors. But if metaphorical meanings are automatically registered then they should take longer to judge as false than their scrambled counterparts because of the response competition between the true non-literal meanings and the false literal ones of the metaphor sentences. The results showed that people had more difficulty deciding if the metaphors were literally false.

Class assertion: Tversky and his contrast model set out to prove that metaphors are treated like implicit similes, so metaphors like "my job is a jail" would be treated as a comparison statement, "my job is like a jail." The problem with this theory is that it fails to account for two important characteristics of metaphorical comparisons. Metaphoric comparisons are irreversible, and people can easily determine whether or not a comparison is literal or metaphorical. Glucksberg argued that metaphors are class-inclusion assertions in which the topic of the metaphor is assigned a certain category. Applied to the example "my job is a jail", the intended meaning of the sentence is that their job belongs to a category that is referred to as a jail. The word "jail" can belong to a number of categories including types of buildings, punishments or situations that are related to the word "jail". In this case the listener would apply the situations related to the word "jail" (unpleasant, confining, and involuntary) to the word "job" and be able to make sense of the metaphor. When used metaphorically, the word "jail" refers to a thing that conveys certain characteristics to mind, while when used literally it refers to an actual token. This can be explained by Roger Brown who argued that metaphors involve categorization. It is understood the same way as taxonomic categories (Rosch, 1973, 1978) which have two sets of structural properties. The property is vertical and reflects the different levels of hierarchy. For example, the category "food" is organized hierarchically with "vegetable" being superordinate, "tomato" being basic and "plum tomato" being subordinate. When applied to "my job is a jail," "jail" would be at the basic level, "county jail" at the subordinate level and situations at the superordinate level. Categories like "jail" represent a set of properties that can be used to characterize a set of properties of a topic of interest, in this case "my job".

Some metaphors are able to be reversed to the contrary of the contrast model. Metaphors like "sermons are sleeping pills" and "a mighty fortress is our God" are able to be reversed because the relative roles of the topic and vehicle are unaffected by the reversal. Glucksberg pointed out the weak points of the contrast model and introduced the class inclusion assertion model which produces similarity relation between a and b, much like any classification of two objects.

== Idioms ==
Gibbs and Nayak (1991) determined that idioms like "he blew his stack" are said to be motivated by mappings such as anger is heated fluid in a container. They presented people with stories that were consistent with this mapping and consistent with the hypothesis that readers activate and use mappings when dealing with idioms. Glucksberg found that while people preferred stylistically consistent idioms, comprehension of nonpreferred idioms was no slower than preferred ones. He concluded that such mappings are available but they are not routinely accessed and used for idiom comprehension. He presented three experiments to test his hypothesis and to determine when mappings are accessed for comprehension. Glucksberg explained that conceptual mapping might be used when presented with novel utterances like "I am feeling lower than a piece of gum stuck on the bottom of your boots." Both the novelty of the expression and the explicit statement of the analogy between emotional state and lowness requires the use of the analogy to understand the expression.

Experiment 1: Making Mappings Explicit

In this experiment participants were introduced to four different types of scenarios: implicit-mapping, no-mapping, explicit-mapping, and literal meaning scenario. If the conceptual mapping view is correct, then the implicit scenario should initiate conceptual mapping and the non-mapping scenario should not. The final sentence then should be easier to understand following the implicit scenario than the non-mapping one, but Glucksberg claims that the implicit model uses stock phrases that can be understood directly, so it would not invoke conceptual mapping. So there should be no difference in ease of comprehension between implicit and the no-mapping scenario. He reasoned that people are more inclined to use conceptual mapping when they are explicitly invited to do so. The results of the experiment showed that it took longer to comprehend the final sentence following the implicit scenario than the no-mapping scenario, but the response time for the implicit scenario was not significantly slower than the no-mapping scenario. The explicit condition yielded results almost identical to the no-mapping condition, suggesting that even when mapping is spelled out to the reader, it is not sufficient to lead them to use mapping in comprehension of stock phrases.

== Sarcasm ==
Sarcasm is characterized as verbal irony, which is when a speaker expresses an attitude toward some object, event, or person by saying something that is not literally true. It usually means the opposite of what the speaker actually says. According to Grice and his Maxims of Conversation, the speaker and listen try to be truthful and say nothing false or it will disrupt the maxim of quality (Grice 1975). The speaker is either violating the maxim of quality or they are trying to communicate a message by appearing to violate the maxim. He said that when someone says something that is opposite to the facts, listeners interpret it as the opposite. The problem with this theory is that it doesn't explain why the speaker is motivated to say the opposite of what they meant, nor does it explain the relevance of saying the opposite of what is meant. Roger Kreuz and Glucksberg propose the echoic reminder theory to explain sarcasm because it provides motivation for saying the opposite of what is meant but it also provides an explanation to the marked asymmetry of ironic statements; positive statements can be used ironically. They conducted three experiments that tested to see how sarcastic a final remark would be in a story prompt the participants were given.

Here is an example of a positive expertise prediction with a negative outcome and a positive remark: Nancy and her friend Jane were planning a trip to the beach. "The weather should be nice tomorrow," said Jane, who worked for a local TV station as a meteorologist. The next day was a cold and stormy one. As she looked out the window, Nancy said, "This is certainly beautiful weather." Participants read stories like this but also with no expertise predictions, negative predictions, or negative remarks. Kreuz and Glucksberg found that when the final remark matched the outcome, participants interpreted no sarcasm. Positive remarks about negative outcomes were interpreted as more sarcastic than negative remarks to positive outcomes, but the influence of an explicit victim was not reliably greater for negative remarks. This suggests that people judge remarks as sarcastic when it is obviously false to the speaker and listener.

== Irony ==
Situations become ironic when an expectation is violated or otherwise invalidated in specific ways (Lucariello, 1994; Muecke, 1969). They explained that unexpectedness is a central property of ironic events. Roger Kreuz and Glucksberg suggested that irony is used to remind of antecedent events, social norms, or shared expectations in order to call attention to a discrepancy between what is and what should have been. Kumon-Nakamura and Glucksberg proposed the allusional pretense theory of irony to explain why sentences come off as ironic. The first part dealt with pragmatic insincerity, which occurs when a speaker is perceived as intentionally violating felicity conditions for at least of these aspects of an utterance. Felicity conditions were originally described by Austin (1962), but they were conditions that every utterance should satisfy in order to be a well-formed functioning speech act. The second part is that ironic utterances must allude to some prior expectation norm or convention that has been violated in one way or another. Similar to the experiments dealing with sarcasm, Glucksberg had participants read short stories that were intended to be ironic and some that were literal. These participants were then asked to judge how ironic the final remark was in each story. The potentially ironic stories participants mentioned that the speaker in the story did not sincerely intend what was said 69% of the time and alluded the listener's attention to some aspect of the situation 36% of the time. When compared to the literal stories, insincerity was mentioned 4% of the time and allusion 11% of the time. This data supports Glucksberg's theory, which is that what makes an expression ironic is not whether it is non-literal but rather if it is intended sincerely.

== Comprehension ==
Contextual information plays a large role in discourse comprehension, but the issue that many psychologists have been trying to solve is how contextual information is used. Models have been proposed to explain how contextual information is used to decide the appropriate meaning of an ambiguous word such as "cast". The "selective access model" suggests that depending on the context of the sentence determines which meaning of the word "cast" comes to mind (orthopedic cast or cast of characters in a play). The "ordered access model" suggests that the more dominant meaning of the word is the meaning formulated first when dealing with an ambiguous word, so the orthopedic cast would be the one called to mind. Through a series of experiments, Glucksberg found that these models might have produced these outcomes in experiments because of backwards priming, which is when a visual target word influences the initial ambiguous word. For example, the ambiguous word "cast" is heard by a listener and then they see the word "actress". While processing the auditory statement, the visual target is available during the mental representation of the ambiguous word, thus bringing about the "cast of characters" meaning to the word rather than the more dominant one. Glucksberg's solution was to use non-words as the visual target so it would eliminate backward priming. He found that context can constrain lexical access using essentially the same paradigms used by others who did not find such evidence.

Similar to ambiguous words, when a person is asked a question, they search for information in their memory that may be relevant to the question, just like trying to use the context to determine which definition to use for a word. If no relevant information is found, a rapid "don't know" response is made, and if there is information available, it is reviewed to determine if it can be used to answer the question. If it fails to provide the right information needed to answer the question, then a slow "don't know" response is made. To test this model Glucksberg presented participants with a series of study sentences that they studied and then were tested with "true", "false", or "don't know" sentences, and their reaction times were recorded. Reaction times for "don't know" sentences were faster than true or false ones, which supports the first part of the model, which is when no relevant information is found a rapid "don't know" is made. To test the second part of the model, he kept the same procedure as the first experiment but added explicit "don't know" sentences and concluded that explicit sentences should take longer to process resulting in a slow "don't know", because memory search will retrieve stored information relating the name and object. This then has to be evaluated to determine the exact relationship between the two, and after it is finished a "don't know" response is made. The implicit "don't know" sentence was identical to the "don't know" sentence in the first experiment. The results showed that participants' reaction times to implicit "don't know" sentences were faster than explicit "don't know" sentences, proving what he proposed in his model.

A famous experiment that involves comprehension is the candle problem, which has to deal with problem solving. The candle problem is a test by Karl Duncker that measures the functional fixedness problem in problem solving. Participants are asked to construct a device holding a candle on the wall. The tools are a book of matches and a box of tacks. Many participants found other ways to hold the candle on the wall like tacking it directly to the wall. Glucksberg was interested to see how labeling influenced the candle problem. He developed three scenarios for participants: all labeled, no label, and just tacks labeled on the box. The solution times for the "all labeled" scenario were a lot faster than the other two scenarios. Glucksberg found that the candle problem solution may be triggered by the observation of the box. In his first experiment, he had participants view the previous scenarios and write down the first words that came to mind under each object in the pictures. After this they then stated ways in which they could erect the candle on the wall. He found that participants in the "all labeled" scenario mentioned the box 90% of the time, 63% for no labels, and 20% for tacks label. The initial solutions stated went as follows: 95% all labels, 65% no labels, and 54% for tacks label. This shows that Glucksberg was right in concluding that the box affects solutions. Providing participants with a verbal label of a functionally fixed object makes that object available for use. The label allows the participants to comprehend the functional use of the objects. That is why when the box is labeled "tack box", participants had trouble finding a solution in erecting the candle, because the box's functional use is to carry the tacks, but when just labeled "box", participants were able find a solution.

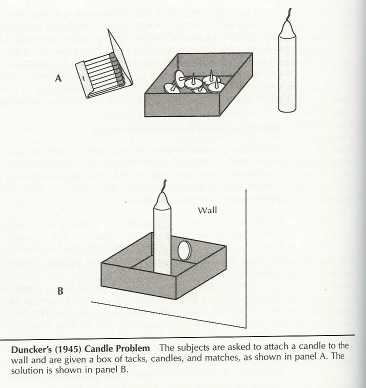
The Candle Problem

== Children and referents ==
If every object, event, or relationship referred to had a specific "name", then the problem of choosing a word or utterance would be reduced to determining the particular associations between referents, the things referred to, and their names. But this is not so, because referents do not have a simple one-to-one correspondence. A referent may be different in one context than it is in another context. Because of this, a listener understands the speaker if they correctly discriminate the referent from a set of non-referents. Young children are described as having non-social communication, which uses free word association, while adults use social communication, which uses an editing process which allows adults to communicate effectively, because they can modify the conversation so both parties can understand. This was shown in Glucksberg's communication game, which had two people who cannot see each other communicate with one another about a novel object. The listener picks a figure (referent) on the basis of the verbal message provided by the speaker. Younger children were unable to effectively have the listener pick up the intended object, because they were unable to modify their message in a socially appropriate way. These children pointed and stated "it looks like this" when trying to have the listener pick up the intended object.

The analysis of this experiment is similar to another experiment Glucksberg conducted testing children's communication skills. Speaker-interaction interaction suggests that in constructing a message the speaker must perform two analyses. The first is the stimulus array in order to make sure his message takes in account the attributes of the referent which will distinguish it from other non-referents. Second is the listener in order that the message may be constructed in a way that is compatible with the listener's knowledge and capabilities. As shown above, adults were able to perform the two-person communication game with near-perfect accuracy, while children were unable to communicate effectively. Glucksberg conducted an experiment to test the relation between age and communication skills. In the experiment he had children from kindergarten, first, third, and fifth grade participate in a game that was called "Stack the Blocks". Children from each grade had to speak to a listener in the same grade that they could not see and have them build a matching set of stacked blocks. Each block had a different design imprinted on it. The results showed that as the game was played with older kids, the less errors were made throughout the game. The younger the kids were, the more errors were made throughout the game. This supports the fact that younger children lack social communication which allows them to communicate effectively to a listener. Glucksberg's findings underscore the point that communication competence should be distinguished from linguistic competence. Children are said to have comparable linguistic performance to adults by age eight, but the results show that this ability seems to develop gradually over the five-year age period in which this experiment tested.

== Honors and memberships ==
- Fellow, American Psychological Association (1976)
- Charter Fellow, American Psychological Society and President, Division of Experimental Psychology (1988–89)
- Fellow, American Association for the Advancement of Science
- Fellow, Psychonomic Society (1985)
- Secretary-Treasurer, Society of Experimental Psychologists (1987–90)
- Member, Society for Research in Child Development; Eastern Psychological Association
- Editor, Psychological Science (1999-2002)
- Editor, Journal of Experimental Psychology: General (1984-1989)
