= Communication problem =

Communication problem or communication issue (or communications problem or communications issue) may refer to:

- Communication disorder, a speech and language disorder
- Communication deficits in autism spectrum disorders
- Miscommunication, the failure of communicating clearly the intended message or idea
- Communications blackout, a cessation of communications in telecommunications
- a communication problem as a computing problem within communication complexity—a theoretical computer science field

== See also ==
- "Communication Breakdown", a song by Led Zeppelin
- Communication Breakdown, an independent film
- "Lack of Communication", a song by Ratt
- Lack of Communication, a music album
- "Failure to Communicate", an episode of the television series House
- XY problem
