= China Media Yearbook & Directory =

- Language: English
- Genre: Media yearbook and directory
- Publisher: CMM Intelligence Limited; General Agency of China Sports Daily Agency
- Publication date: 1999–present
- Publication place: China
- ISBN: 978-0-9793693-1-5

The China Media Yearbook & Directory (traditional Chinese: 中國媒體年鑑; simplified Chinese: 中国媒体年鉴), also spelled as China Media Yearbook and Directory, sometimes known as China Media Yearbook, is a China-based comprehensive publication on the market covering China's media industries published in English language. It has been published annually since 1999 by CMM Intelligence Limited and General Agency of China Sports Daily Agency (中国体育报社总社).

China Media Yearbook is the only English annual publication on the media market in the Mainland China. The main content of the Yearbook includes in-depth analysis and insights into the Chinese media industries, including TV policies and content, print, film, new media, advertising, the latest developments in Chinese media policies and regulations, media trends and business transactions as well as proprietary statistics and a comprehensive list including enterprise profiles of over 300 major Chinese media institutions in various industries.
