= David Luchins =

David Luchins (born 1946) is a professor at Touro College and chair of its political science department. He is a national vice-president of the Orthodox Union and a national officer of the Jewish Council for Public Affairs (JCPA). Luchins is a "much-lauded longtime Orthodox Jewish activist" who is active in Jewish communal life and is a frequent speaker on educational, political and Jewish topics. Luchins served as an aide to then-Vice President Hubert Humphrey and for 20 years on the Senate staff of New York Senator Daniel Patrick Moynihan.

== Life and career ==
Luchins was born in New York City, the eldest son of Abraham Luchins, a Gestalt psychologist, and Edith Hirsch Luchins, a mathematician and psychologist, who was one of the first women to serve on the national board of the Orthodox Union. He is a graduate of Yeshiva College, where he studied under Rabbi Ahron Soloveichik in his sophomore year and four years under Rabbi Joseph B. Soloveitchik. In 1977, Luchins earned his Ph.D. from the Graduate Center of the City University of New York. He has been chairman of the political science department at Touro College since 1978, where he teaches courses in American politics and international relations and serves as founding dean of Touro's Lander College for Women.

Luchins is a frequent speaker at high schools, colleges, synagogues and Jewish communal groups in North America and Israel, lecturing on political and social issues. In summer, he serves as a guest instructor at Aish HaTorah, an Orthodox religious outreach program located in the Old City of Jerusalem. He has been a vice-president of the Orthodox Union since 1976 and a member of the executive committee of the Jewish Council for Public Affairs since 1984. He formerly served on the national commissions of the Anti-Defamation League and the Jewish Fund for Justice.

Luchins is married to Vivian Luchins née Osdoby, a graduate of Yeshiva University's Stern College for Women. The couple met as high school students active in the National Conference of Synagogue Youth, the Orthodox Union's youth organization. Now called simply NCSY, the organization honored the Luchinses in 2011 for 50 years of service. Vivian Luchins is chair of NCSY summer programs, a senior member of the Orthodox Union's youth commission and a member of the Orthodox Union's national board. The couple lives in the Bronx.

== Politically liberal and religiously Orthodox ==
A longtime political supporter of, and advisor to, Democratic candidates and office-holders, Luchins has also supported and advised Republicans. Writing in The Jewish Daily Forward, Jeffrey Goldberg described Luchins as "a liberal – or a 'leftist', as he prefers – in an Orthodox community that is ever-more conservative [whose] tart tongue has often landed him in the center of controversy."

Luchins served on the 1972 presidential campaign staff of Senator Hubert Humphrey, and subsequently as a national vice chair of Democrats for Nixon. For 20 years, he served on the Senate staff of New York Senator Daniel Patrick Moynihan, rising from special assistant to senior advisor. He later supported Republican Senator Alfonse D'Amato.

After Moynihan's funeral in 2003, at Arlington National Cemetery, Luchins indicated that he would be withdrawing from political activities, saying "everything I cared about in politics was buried Monday in Arlington Cemetery."

In 2004, Luchins spoke on behalf of the Orthodox Union about Israeli Prime Minister Ariel Sharon's Gaza disengagement plan, saying that "Jews who want to take sides in Israeli politics should make aliya," using the Hebrew word for immigration to the State of Israel.

Luchins has argued that Jewish tradition stands in opposition to fundamentalism. For the 2008 book, Progressive & Religious: How Christian, Jewish, Muslim, and Buddhist Leaders are Moving Beyond Partisan Politics and Transforming American Public Life, Luchins was asked how it was possible to be "an Orthodox liberal". He answered that an Orthodox social conservative "would be pretty lonely because you don't have too many sources, because the vast part of our religious tradition talks about ... tikkun olam, helping others; it's the number one priority of faith".

In 2009, Luchins offered a reporter writing about elections in New York's ultra-Orthodox Jewish communities example after example of cases where non-Jewish candidates (or non-observant Jewish candidates) who seemed likely to deliver services won out over religiously identified Jewish politicians. "Constituent services trumps personal biography every single time in the Orthodox Jewish community ... without exception," he observed.

In a 2013 lecture on "Gay Marriages Revisited", delivered at the Israel Center in Jerusalem, Luchins, who considers himself a "staunch gay rights supporter", made the point that "punishment for cheating in business according to the Torah is greater than for the sum total of all the sexual atrocities forbidden by the Torah". Upholding that gay relationship is forbidden by Jewish law, he adds that "the fact that the Torah forbids certain behavior does not mean we should demonize, delegitimize or write out of our religion or our humanity those who may fall short, as we all fall short in so many areas... In the area of kindness to every human being, Jew and Gentile, white and black, gay and straight, even Republicans are created in the image of God."

== Awards ==
In 2015, Luchins received the Albert D. Chernin Award from the Jewish Council for Public Affairs (JCPA) at its annual meeting, the 2015 Jewish Community Town Hall, October 10–13, in Washington, D.C. The Chernin Award is given to Jewish leaders whose life work best exemplifies the social justice imperatives of Judaism, Jewish history, and the protection of The Bill of Rights.

=== Threat of excommunication ===
In 1994, Milton Balkany, a conservative Republican active in political fundraising, tried to have Luchins excommunicated by a Jewish religious court, blaming him for having "caused yeshivas in the land of Israel to lose money", after Luchins had complained about Balkany's efforts to compel Israeli government officials to use U.S. aid money for projects Balkany favored in Israel. In March 1995, a Rabbinic Court dismissed all charges against Luchins.

== Chabad Lubavitch ==
=== Personal and family relationship ===
In a 2009 interview with Chabad Lubavitch News, Luchins affirmed his and his family's personal connection to Chabad Lubavitch and to Yosef Yitzchok Schneersohn and Menachem Mendel Schneerson, the sixth and seventh Lubavitcher Rebbes.

=== Lubavitch messianism ===
In late June 1996 several Jewish newspapers published a statement signed by Rabbi Ahron Soloveichik opposing attacks on Lubavitcher Hasidim who believed that the late Menachem Mendel Schneerson, the seventh Lubavitcher Rebbe, who had died in 1994, was the Messiah. The statement said that the messianists' belief in the role of the rebbe, even after his death, "cannot be dismissed as a belief that is outside the pale of Orthodoxy". Lubavitch messianists celebrated the statement and Jews for Jesus released their own announcement, expressing satisfaction with "the Tzaddik from Chicago". Luchins, after consulting with Soloveichik, wrote a letter published in the Jewish Daily Forward and the Jewish Week, condemning the way Soloveichik's words were presented, saying that "using Rabbi Soloveichik in this way is a tremendous disservice to one of the great Torah giants of our generation," and adding "I am certain the Lubavitcher rebbe would be deeply pained by this use of Rabbi Soloveichik's name."

== The Jonathan Pollard case ==
Luchins has advocated the release of Jonathan Pollard, an American Jew sentenced to life in prison for spying for Israel; he has also described the pro-Pollard movement a "cult", saying that "Pollard has become a flag of convenience.... He's become a cause that is picked up by other people and used for their own purposes."

In a March 2007 interview with Susan Rosenbluth of The Jewish Voice and Opinion, Luchins, a student of Rabbi Ahron Soleveichik and a senior advisor to Daniel Patrick Moynahan, described the men's role in trying to free Pollard. According to Luchins, shortly after then-President Bill Clinton 1993 inauguration, he was approached by Moynihan and Senator Joseph Lieberman about Pollard's release; the president was reportedly willing to commute Pollard's sentence and order his release if he wrote a letter expressing clear remorse. Rabbi Ahron Soloveichik brought a letter of apology vetted by the White House to Pollard in prison, for his signature. Reportedly, Pollard signed the letter and Lieberman hand-delivered it to Clinton. However, while the letter was still on Clinton's desk, Pollard is reported to have had a change of heart, renouncing the letter and criticizing a portion that apologized for violating Jewish law. According to Luchins, Pollard was pressured by "the Pollard people, the more intense members of the cult", with the result that what seemed like a firm deal to accomplish Pollard's release from prison fell apart. Esther Pollard (Eileen Zeitz) denies that Pollard was ever asked to sign any such letter.

Luchins' life was threatened by Pollard supporters who circulated a flyer that has been characterized as "a Salman Rushdie-style religious decree calling for Luchins' murder".
