= Insight =

Understanding of a specific cause and effect in a specific context

Insight is the understanding of a specific cause and effect within a particular context. The term insight can have several related meanings:

- a piece of information
- the act or result of understanding the inner nature of things or of seeing intuitively (called noesis in Greek)
- an introspection
- the power of acute observation and deduction, discernment, and perception, called intellection or noesis
- an understanding of cause and effect based on the identification of relationships and behaviors within a model, system, context, or scenario (see artificial intelligence)

An insight that manifests itself suddenly, such as understanding how to solve a difficult problem, is sometimes called by the German word Aha-Erlebnis. The term was coined by the German psychologist and theoretical linguist Karl Bühler. It is also known as an epiphany, eureka moment, or (for crossword solvers) the penny dropping moment (PDM). Sudden sickening realisations often identify a problem rather than solving it, so Uh-oh rather than Aha moments are seen in negative insight. A further example of negative insight is chagrin which is annoyance at the obviousness of a solution that was missed up until the (perhaps too late) point of insight, an example of this being Homer Simpson's catchphrase exclamation, D'oh!.

== Psychology ==
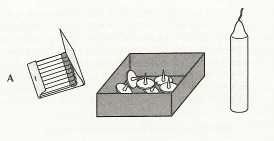
The candle problem by Karl Duncker asks how a candle might be affixed to a wall using only matches and tacks

In psychology, insight occurs when a solution to a problem presents itself quickly and without warning. It is the sudden discovery of the correct solution following incorrect attempts based on trial and error. Solutions via insight have been proven to be more accurate than non-insight solutions.

Insight was first studied by Gestalt psychology, in the early part of the 20th century, during the search for an alternative to associationism and the associationistic view of learning. Some proposed potential mechanisms for insight include: suddenly seeing the problem in a new way, connecting the problem to another relevant problem/solution pair, releasing past experiences that are blocking the solution, or seeing problem in a larger, coherent context.

=== Classic methods ===
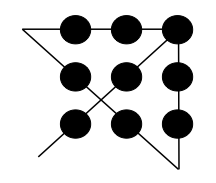
Solution to the Nine-dot problem

Generally, methodological approaches to the study of insight in the laboratory involve presenting participants with problems and puzzles that cannot be solved in a conventional or logical manner. Problems of insight commonly fall into three types:

==== Breaking functional fixedness ====
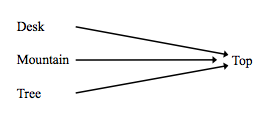
Example of a RAT problem

The first type of problem forces participants to use objects in a way they are not accustomed to (thus, breaking their functional fixedness). An example is the "Duncker candle problem", in which people are given matches and a box of tacks and asked to find a way to attach a candle to the wall to light the room. The solution requires the participants to empty the box of tacks, set the candle inside the box, tack the box to the wall, and light the candle with the matches.

==== Spatial ability ====
The second type of insight problem requires spatial ability to solve. An example is the "Nine-dot problem" which requires participants to draw four lines, through nine dots, without picking their pencil up.

==== Using verbal ability ====
The third and final type of problem requires verbal ability to solve. An example is the Remote Associates Test (RAT), in which people must think of a word that connects three, seemingly unrelated, words. RAT are often used in experiments, because they can be solved both with and without insight.

=== Specific results ===
==== Versus non-insight problems ====
Two clusters of problems, those solvable by insight and those not requiring insight to solve, have been observed. A person's cognitive flexibility, fluency, and vocabulary ability are predictive of performance on insight problems, but not on non-insight problems. In contrast, fluid intelligence is mildly predictive of performance on non-insight problems, but not on insight problems. More recent research suggests that rather than insight versus search, that the subjective feeling of insight varies, with some solutions experienced with a stronger feeling of Aha than others.

==== Emotion ====
People in a better mood are more likely to solve problems using insight. Self-reported positive affect of participants increased insight before and during the solving of a problem, as indicated by differing brain activity patterns. People experiencing anxiety showed the opposite effect, and solved fewer problems by insight. Emotion can also be considered: whether this is a positive Aha or negative Uh-oh moment. In order to have insights it is important to have access to one's emotions and sensations, as these can cause insights. To the degree that individuals have limited introspective access to these underlying causes, they have only limited control over these processes as well.

==== Incubation ====
Using a geometric and spatial insight problem, it was found that providing participants with breaks improved their performance when compared to participants who did not receive a break. However, the length of incubation between problems did not matter. Thus, participants' performance on insight problems improved just as much with a short break (4 minutes) as it did with a long break (12 minutes).

==== Sleep ====
Research has shown sleep to help produce insight. People were initially trained on insight problems. Following training, one group was tested on the insight problems after sleeping for eight hours at night, one group was tested after staying awake all night, and one group was tested after staying awake all day. Those that slept performed twice as well on the insight problems than those who stayed awake.

==== In the brain ====
Differences in brain activation in the left and right hemisphere seem to be indicative of insight versus non-insight solutions. Presenting RATs either to the left or right visual field, it was shown that participants having solved the problem with insight were more likely to have been shown the RAT on the left visual field, indicating right hemisphere processing. This provides evidence that the right hemisphere plays a special role in insight.

fMRI and EEG scans of participants completing RATs demonstrated particular brain activity corresponding to problems solved by insight. For example, there is high EEG activity in the alpha- and gamma-band about 300 milliseconds before participants indicated a solution to insight problems, but not to non-insight problems. Additionally, problems solved by insight corresponded to increased activity in the temporal lobes and mid-frontal cortex, while more activity in the posterior cortex corresponded to non-insight problems. The data suggests there is something different occurring in the brain when solving insight versus non-insight problems that happens right before the solving of the problem. This conclusion has been supported also by eye-tracking data that shows an increased eye blink duration and frequency when people solve problems via insight. This latter result, paired with an eye pattern oriented to look away from sources of visual inputs (such as looking at blank wall, or out the window at the sky) proves different attention involvement in insight problem solving vs. problem solving via analysis.

==== Group insight ====
Groups typically perform better on insight problems (in the form of rebus puzzles with either helpful or unhelpful clues) than individuals.

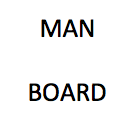
Example of a rebus puzzle. Answer: man overboard.

Additionally, while incubation improves insight performance for individuals, it improves insight performance for groups even more. Thus, after a 15-minute break, individual performance improved for the rebus puzzles with unhelpful clues, and group performance improved for rebus puzzles with both unhelpful and helpful clues.

==== Individual differences ====
Participants who ranked lower on emotionality and higher on openness to experience performed better on insight problems. Men outperformed women on insight problems, and women outperformed men on non-insight problems.

Higher intelligence (higher IQ) is associated with better performance on insight problems. However, those of lower intelligence benefit more than those of higher intelligence from being provided with cues and hints for insight problems.

A large-scale study in Australia suggests that insight may not be universally experienced, with almost 20% of respondents reporting that they had not experienced insight.

==== Metacognition ====
People are poorer at predicting their own metacognition for insight problems, than for non-insight problems. People were asked to indicate how "hot" or "cold" to a solution they felt. Generally, they were able to predict this fairly well for non-insight problems, but not for insight problems. This provides evidence for the suddenness involved during insight.

==== Naturalistic settings ====
Accounts of insight that have been reported in the media, such as in interviews, etc., were examined and coded. Insights that occur in the field are typically reported to be associated with a sudden "change in understanding" and with "seeing connections and contradictions" in the problem. Insight in nature differed from insight in the laboratory. For example, insight in nature was often rather gradual, not sudden, and incubation was not as important.

Other studies used online questionnaires to explore insight outside of the laboratory, verifying the notion that insight often happens in situations such as in the shower, and echoing the idea that creative ideas occur in situations where divergent thought is more likely, sometimes called the Three "B"s of Creativity, in Bed, on the Bus, or in the Bath.

==== Non-Human Animals ====
Studies on primate cognition have provided evidence of what may be interpreted as insight in animals. In 1917, Wolfgang Köhler published his book The Mentality of Apes, having studied primates on the island of Tenerife for six years. In one of his experiments, apes were presented with an insight problem that required the use of objects in new and original ways, in order to win a prize (usually, some kind of food). He observed that the animals would continuously fail to get the food, and this process occurred for quite some time; however, rather suddenly, they would purposefully use the object in the way needed to get the food, as if the realization had occurred out of nowhere. He interpreted this behavior as something resembling insight in apes. A more recent study suggested that elephants might also experience insight, showing that a young male elephant was able to identify and move a large cube under food that was out of reach so that he could stand on it to get the reward.

=== Theories ===
There are a number of theories about insight; no single theory dominates interpretation.

==== Dual-process theory ====
According to the dual-process theory, there are two systems that people use to solve problems. The first involves logical and analytical thought processes based on reason, while the second involves intuitive and automatic processes based on experience. Research has demonstrated that insight probably involves both processes; however, the second process is more influential.

==== Three-process theory ====
According to the three-process theory, intelligence plays a large role in insight. Specifically, insight involves three processes that require intelligence to apply them to problems:

selective encoding
focusing attention on ideas relevant to a solution, while ignoring features that are irrelevant
selective combination
combining the information previously deemed relevant
selective comparison
the use of past experience with problems and solutions that are applicable to the current problem and solution

==== Four-stage model ====
According to the four-stage model of insight, there are four stages to problem solving:

1. The person prepares to solve a problem.
2. The person incubates on the problem, which encompasses trial-and-error, etc.
3. The insight occurs, and the solution is illuminated.
4. The verification of the solution to the problem is experienced.

Since this model was proposed, other similar models have been explored that contain two or three similar stages.

== Psychiatry ==
In psychology and psychiatry, insight can mean the ability to recognize one's own mental illness. This form of insight has multiple dimensions, such as recognizing the need for treatment, and recognizing consequences of one's behavior as stemming from an illness. A person with very poor recognition or acknowledgment is referred to as having "poor insight" or "lack of insight". The most extreme form is anosognosia, the total absence of insight into one's own mental illness. Mental illnesses are associated with a variety of levels of insight. For example, people with obsessive–compulsive disorder (OCD) and various phobias tend to have relatively good insight that they have a problem and that their thoughts and/or actions are unreasonable, although they feel compelled to carry out the thoughts and actions regardless. Patients with schizophrenia, and various psychotic conditions tend to have very poor awareness that anything is wrong with them.

Psychiatric insight can be broken into a number of dimensions. Clinical insight, awareness of one's own disease and associated symptoms, is the oldest formulation. Aaron Beck et al. published a Beck cognitive insight scale (BCIS) in 2004, measuring the new concept of cognitive insight, that is, one's ability to recognize and distance oneself from distorted beliefs, and to re-evaluate and update existing beliefs. Finally, the concept of introspective accuracy, or one's ability to assess their own skills and capabilities, was developed from self-assessment questionnaire research in the 2000s.

Good cognitive insight predicts favorable outcomes in cognitive behavioural therapy for people with psychosis. On the other hand, for people with schizophrenia, good cognitive insight is associated with higher self-stigma, higher insight into treatment, and lower medication compliance. It is not associated with a change in quality-of-life. Among people with schizophrenia, introspective accuracy is a very powerful predictor for functional outcomes.

== Spirituality ==
The Pali word for "insight" is vipassana, which has been adopted as the name of a variety of Buddhist mindfulness meditation. Research indicates that mindfulness meditation facilitates solving of insight problems with dosage of 20 minutes.

Similar concepts in Zen Buddhism are kenshō and satori.

== See also ==
- Christian ethics – Branch of theology that defines virtuous and sinful behavior from a Christian perspective
- Genius – Exceptional intellectual ability, creativity, or originality
- Grok – Neologism coined by Robert Heinlein
- Human self-reflection – Capacity of humans to exercise introspection
- Introspection – Examining one's own thoughts and feelings
- Bernard Lonergan – Canadian philosopher and theologian (1904–1984)
- Psychological mindedness – Person's capacity for self-examination
- Sagacity – Combination of wit and virtue
- Self awareness – Capacity for introspection and individuation as a subject
- Virtue ethics – Normative ethical theories
