= Law of the instrument =

Over-reliance on a familiar tool

The law of the instrument, law of the hammer, Maslow's hammer, or golden hammer (Note: By analogy with silver bullet.) is a cognitive bias that involves an over-reliance on a familiar tool. Abraham Maslow wrote in 1966, "it is tempting, if the only tool you have is a hammer, to treat everything as if it were a nail."

The concept is attributed both to Maslow and to Abraham Kaplan, although the hammer and nail line may not be original to either of them.

== History ==
The English expression "a Birmingham screwdriver", meaning a hammer, refers to the practice of using the one tool for all purposes, and predates both Kaplan and Maslow by at least a century.

In 1868, a London periodical, Once a Week, contained this observation: "Give a boy a hammer and chisel; show him how to use them; at once he begins to hack the doorposts, to take off the corners of shutter and window frames, until you teach him a better use for them, and how to keep his activity within bounds."

=== Kaplan ===
The first recorded statement of the concept was Abraham Kaplan's, in 1964: "I call it the law of the instrument, and it may be formulated as follows: Give a small boy a hammer, and he will find that everything he encounters needs pounding."

In February 1962 Kaplan, then a professor of philosophy, gave a banquet speech at a conference of the American Educational Research Association that was being held at UCLA. An article in the June 1962 issue of the Journal of Medical Education stated that "the highlight of the 3-day meeting ... was to be found in Kaplan's comment on the choice of methods for research. He urged that scientists exercise good judgment in the selection of appropriate methods for their research. Because certain methods happen to be handy, or a given individual has been trained to use a specific method, is no assurance that the method is appropriate for all problems. He cited Kaplan's Law of the Instrument: 'Give a boy a hammer and everything he meets has to be pounded.'"

In The Conduct of Inquiry: Methodology for Behavioral Science (1964), Kaplan again mentioned the law of the instrument saying, "It comes as no particular surprise to discover that a scientist formulates problems in a way which requires for their solution just those techniques in which he himself is especially skilled." And in a 1964 article for The Library Quarterly, he again cited the law and commented: "We tend to formulate our problems in such a way as to make it seem that the solutions to those problems demand precisely what we already happen to have at hand."

=== Tomkins and Colby ===
In a 1963 essay collection, Computer Simulation of Personality: Frontier of Psychological Theory, Silvan Tomkins wrote about "the tendency of jobs to be adapted to tools, rather than adapting tools to jobs". He wrote: "If one has a hammer one tends to look for nails, and if one has a computer with a storage capacity, but no feelings, one is more likely to concern oneself with remembering and with problem solving than with loving and hating." In the same book, Kenneth Mark Colby explicitly cited the law, writing: "The First Law of the Instrument states that if you give a boy a hammer, he suddenly finds that everything needs pounding. The computer program may be our current hammer, but it must be tried. One cannot decide from purely armchair considerations whether or not it will be of any value."

=== Abraham Maslow ===
Maslow's hammer, popularly phrased as "if all you have is a hammer, everything looks like a nail" and variants thereof, is from Abraham Maslow's The Psychology of Science, published in 1966. Maslow wrote: "I remember seeing an elaborate and complicated automatic washing machine for automobiles that did a beautiful job of washing them. But it could do only that, and everything else that got into its clutches was treated as if it were an automobile to be washed. I suppose it is tempting, if the only tool you have is a hammer, to treat everything as if it were a nail."

=== Lee Loevinger ===
In 1967, Lee Loevinger of the Federal Communications Commission dubbed the law "Loevinger's law of irresistible use", and applied it to government: "The political science analogue is that if there is a government agency, this proves something needs regulating."

=== Warren Buffett ===
In 1984, investor Warren Buffett criticized academic studies of financial markets that made use of inappropriate mathematical approaches:

It isn't necessarily because such studies have any utility; it's simply that the data are there and academicians have worked hard to learn the mathematical skills needed to manipulate them. Once these skills are acquired, it seems sinful not to use them, even if the usage has no utility or negative utility. As a friend said, to a man with a hammer, everything looks like a nail."

=== Robert Kagan ===
In his 2003 book, Of Paradise and Power, historian Robert Kagan suggested a corollary to the law: "When you don't have a hammer, you don't want anything to look like a nail." According to Kagan, the corollary explains the difference in views on the use of military force the United States and Europe have held since the end of World War II.

== Manifestations ==
=== Psychiatry ===
Some critics of psychiatry claim that the law of the instrument leads to the over-prescription of psychiatric drugs.

=== Computer programming ===
The notion of a golden hammer, "a familiar technology or concept applied obsessively to many software problems", was introduced into information technology literature in 1998 as an anti-pattern: a programming practice to be avoided.

Software developer José M. Gilgado has written that the law is still relevant in the 21st century and is highly applicable to software development. Many times software developers, he observed, "tend to use the same known tools to do a completely new different project with new constraints". He blamed this on "the comfort zone state where you don't change anything to avoid risk. The problem with using the same tools every time you can is that you don't have enough arguments to make a choice because you have nothing to compare to and is limiting your knowledge." The solution is "to keep looking for the best possible choice, even if we aren't very familiar with it". This includes using a computer language with which one is unfamiliar. He noted that the product RubyMotion enables developers to "wrap" unknown computer languages in a familiar computer language and thus avoid having to learn them. But Gilgado found this approach inadvisable, because it reinforces the habit of avoiding new tools.

== Related concepts ==
Other forms of narrow-minded instrumentalism include: déformation professionnelle, a French term for "looking at things from the point of view of one's profession", and regulatory capture, the tendency for regulators to look at things from the point of view of the profession they are regulating.

== In media ==
In the science fiction series The Expanse, politician Chrisjen Avasarala says "For a hammer, everything looks like a nail" in reference to the Golden Hammer analogy, when she criticised the Earth's military leaders' tendencies to see enemy actions behind everything.

In her 2025 single Hammer, Lorde sings "when you're holding a hammer, everything looks like a nail". In the context of the verse it is part of, the lyric is likely to be a double entendre.

== See also ==
- Confirmation bias – Bias confirming existing attitudes
- Einstellung effect – Development of a mechanized state of mind
- Functional fixedness – Inability to use an object other than how it is traditionally used
- Iron cage – Concept in sociology
- Panacea – Supposed universal remedy
- List of proverbial phrases
