= Käte Duncker =

German politician (1871–1953)

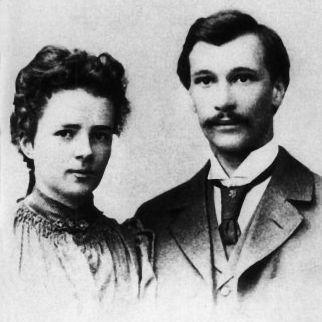
- Käte and Hermann Duncker c. 1900
- Born: Paula Kathinka Döll; 23 May 1871; Lörrach, Baden, German Empire
- Died: 2 May 1953 (aged 81); Bernau bei Berlin, East Germany
- Occupations: Political activist feminist activist politician writer
- Political party: SPD; KPD
- Spouse: Hermann Duncker (m. 1898)
- Children: Hedwig Duncker; Karl Duncker; Wolfgang Duncker

Käte Duncker (born Paula Kathinka Döll; 23 May 1871 – 2 May 1953) was a German political and feminist activist who became a politician in the Social Democratic Party of Germany and then the Communist Party of Germany.

== Life ==
=== Provenance and early childhood ===
Paula Kathinka Döll was born in Lörrach (Baden), directly across the border to the north of Basel. Her father was a businessman and the family lived reasonably well, but when she was seven her father died and her mother took them to live at Friedrichroda on the edge of the Thuringian Forest, and where her mother ran a small guest house for summer holidaymakers.

=== Politics trumps teaching ===
She attended an all-girls' school in Friedrichroda and the commercial school in Gotha before moving on to the Teacher Training College in Eisenach between 1888 and 1890. Her ambition to become a teacher had encountered initial opposition from her guardian and her mother, but she nevertheless persisted, passing her qualifying exams in 1890 and teaching, initially, in Friedrichroda. By 1893 she had moved to Leipzig where she taught in a girls' school. In November 1893 she attended a political meeting which was addressed by Clara Zetkin by whom she was greatly impressed. The next year she herself started teaching at evening classes organised by the Leipzig Workers' Education League. It was here that she first met Hermann Duncker, studying to become a music teacher, and later her husband. However, in 1895 or 1896 she lost her job at the Leipzig school because of her Socialism ("wegen sozialistischer Gesinnung").

She moved to Hamburg where she taught at another all-girls' school. In Hamburg she became involved in the dockworkers' strike which occurred between November 1896 and February 1897. As a result of her support for the strike she was, as before, dismissed from her teaching post. The realisation that the career teaching children which she loved and for which she had struggled, was going to be incompatible with her political involvement, was a heavy blow. She returned to Leipzig where, despite not being enrolled at the university, she was able to attend certain lectures on a "guest basis", notably those delivered by Karl Bücher. It was, she later asserted, as a result of her studies at this time that she produced her first publication, "On the participation of the female sex in employment" ("Ueber die Beteiligung des weiblichen Geschlechts an der Erwerbsthätigkeit"). Her study concluded that industrialisation would expand employment openings for women, and that it would become impossible to restrict women's professional careers.

From a 1901 Leipzig police report:

"The most spiritually stirring and outstanding agitator in the local social democratic women's movement is the former teacher, now Mrs. Duncker, who appears as a speaker in almost all women's meetings in order to campaign against the respectable middle-class women's associations."

"Die geistig hervorragendste Agitatorin der hiesigen sozialdem. Frauenbewegung ist die frühere Lehrerin, jetzige Frau Duncker, die fast in allen Frauenversammlungen als Rednerin auftritt und dabei die bürgerlichen Frauenvereinigungen bekämpft."

She married Hermann Duncker, by now an economics student, towards the end of 1898. Their daughter, Hedwig, was born in 1899. In the meantime, Käte immersed herself in the leftwing politics of the city, becoming first a member of the Social Democratic Party ("Sozialdemokratische Partei Deutschlands" / SPD) and then a party worker, although legally it only became permissible for women to participate in politics in 1908. She employed her teaching skills, giving lectures to the Workers' Education League covering literature, pedagogy, history, socio-politics and economics. She became the chair of the "Association for women and girls of the working class" ("Verein für Frauen und Mädchen der Arbeiterklasse") in Leipzig.

In February 1903 the couple's second child, Karl was born: Käte Duncker's health collapsed. They moved away from Leipzig to Dresden. As she recovered she returned to lecturing on child protection, education and women's rights. Another publication on child labour ("Die Kinderarbeit und ihre Bekämpfung") appeared in 1906. Over the next few years she developed a close friendship with Clara Zetkin which was both personal and political. In 1906 she became deputy controlling editor for "Die Gleichheit" ("Equality"), the women's magazine managed by Zetkin, under whose direction it had surged from obscurity to a distribution estimated in 1907 at 70,000 copies. Duncker's particular area of responsibility on the paper was the section entitled "For our children", which became a great favourite with working-class families.

In 1906 she gave a presentation to the fourth SPD Women's Congress in Mannheim on care of women during and following pregnancy. In 1907 the family relocated to Stuttgart. That year she gave a presentation on education to the Women's Congress in Nuremberg. In 1910 she was a delegate at the International Socialist Women's Conference in Copenhagen (held in tandem with that year's International Socialist Congress), at which she delivered a presentation on motherhood and childcare. She was also involved in the resolution to introduce an international Women's Day, proposed at the conference by her friend, Clara Zetkin. The first International Women's Day celebrated in Germany (and Denmark, Austria and Switzerland) duly took place on 19 March 1911 (although the idea had come from a national Women's Day first celebrated in New York on 28 February 1909).

In 1911 Duncker gave a presentation to the SPD Party Conference, held that year in Jena, where, according to one source, she had her first encounter with Rosa Luxemburg. By now, a couple of months before the birth of her third child early in 1909, she had withdrawn from her editorial position with "Die Gleichheit". She had been a member of the party's national Education Committee since 1908. In 1912 the family relocated again, this time to Berlin.

=== War and the Spartacus League ===
Käte Duncker and World War I. An admirer (and former pupil) writes:

"Suddenly the entire weight and responsibility of such wide ranging and dangerous organisational work lay on the shoulders of this delicate woman. Already sufficiently burdened by her domestic difficulties [possibly involving her sensitive elder son], unhesitatingly everything that the times and circumstances required."

"Plötzlich lag die ganze Last und Verantwortung der so umfassenden wie gefährlichen Organisationsarbeit auf den schwachen Schultern dieser zarten Frau. Sie, die mit ihren häuslichen Sorgen schon genug beschwert war, hat aber ohne Zögern alles auf sich genommen und alles geleistet, was Zeit und Umstände erforderten."

Jacob Walcher, writing in 1949

War broke out at the end of July 1914. In the Reichstag (national parliament) the SPD leadership implemented an effective party truce for its duration. In a vote held on 4 August 1914, instead of voting against war credits, the SPD abstained. From the outset, however, this version of patriotism from the party leadership encountered opposition from internationalist and left-wing party members. Hermann and Käte Duncker passionately opposed funding for the war, and as economic destitution on the home front mounted, the call for an end to the slaughter on the front line would only grow louder. In 1915 Käte Duncker, was a co-founder of the news-sheet, "The International", to which she became a frequent contributor. The news-sheet took its name from International Group which had been launched within the SPD on the initiative of Rosa Luxemburg at outbreak of the war and to which the Dunckers had been early recruits.

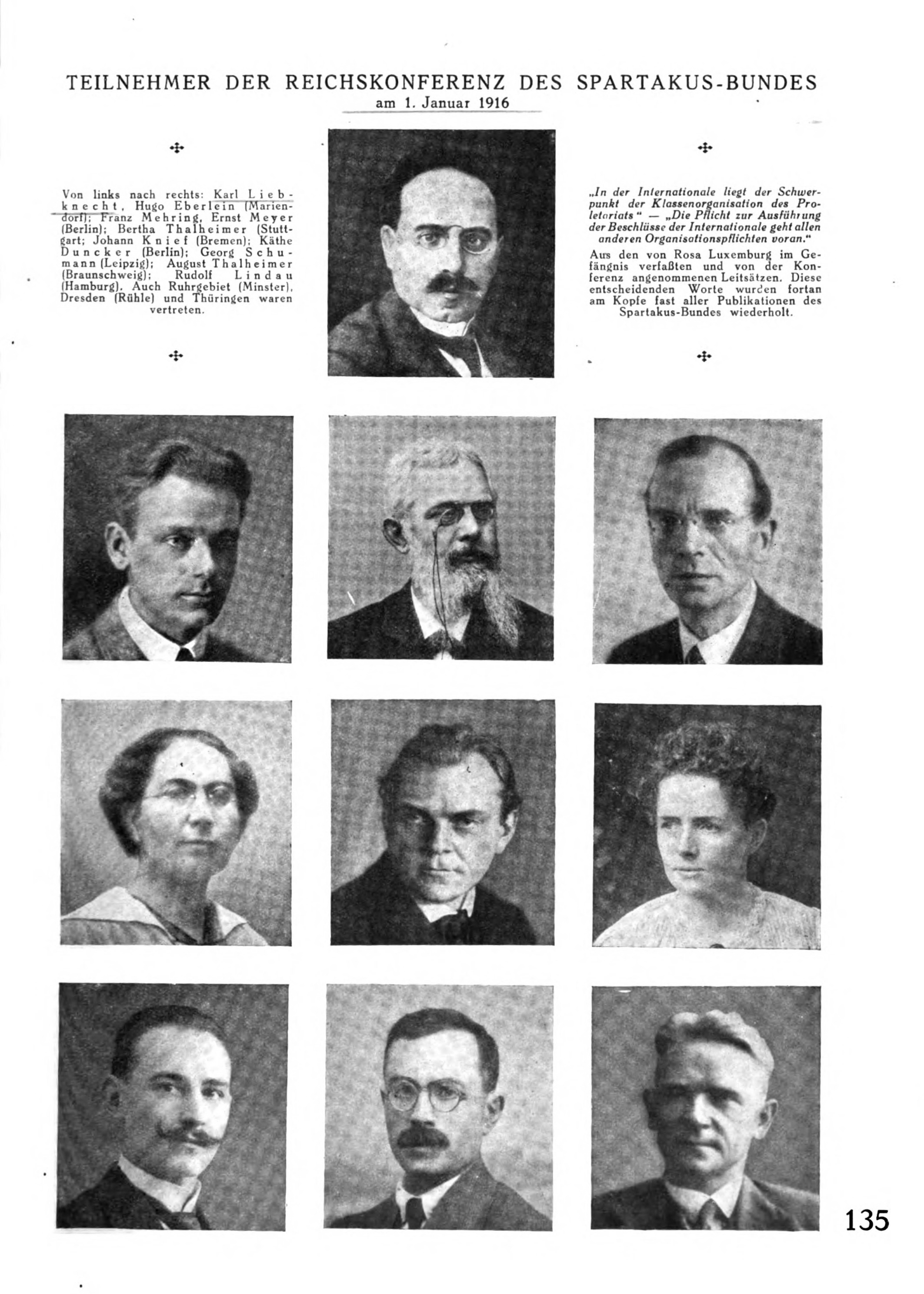
Duncker (third row, right) among participants of the Reich Conference of the Spartacus League, 1 January 1916

In 1916 the International Group was renamed, becoming the Spartacus League. Duncker continued to campaign against the war, using her background on the party's education to locate and address youth groups, while also producing illegal "Spartacus Letters" ("Spartakusbriefe"), carrying the same pro-peace messages. This earned her a "speech ban" on 30 May 1916. She worked in Berlin with Leo Jogiches to coordinate anti-war efforts across the country. In September 1916 she represented the Spartacus League at the national party conference of the SPD. Shortly after this she suffered a health crisis and spent three months in a sanatorium. From 1918 she was responsible for "Women work" ("Frauenarbeit") in the Spartacus League headquarters.

=== Post war chaos ===
Regarding the closing phases of the war, sources are relatively silent on her pacifist activism. In the context of the revolutionary months that followed national military defeat, following the murders in January 1919 of Rosa Luxemburg and Karl Liebknecht, Käte Duncker was arrested on 16 January 1919: she was briefly detained and interrogated. She then moved back to Leipzig where the risk of sudden attack or further arrest seemed less pressing than in Berlin. During the war her sons had been sent to Denmark where they were staying with friends, and in Match 1919, around the time when Leo Jogiches was murdered, she joined them. However, her Danish residence permit was of short duration, and at the end of May 1919 she had to move on to Sweden, where Efraim Liljequist, a philosophy professor at Lund University to whom her friend Gertrud Liljequist was married, was able to provide the necessary guarantees on her behalf. From Lund she followed post war developments with keen interest. Writing to her husband on 25 June 1919, she identified the peace terms imposed by US president, Woodrow Wilson as the "dictates of an imperialistic power, victorious following the downfall of its German rival" ("Diktat imperialistischer Siegermächte über den niedergeworfenen Konkurrenten Deutschland"). However, much of her attention was devoted to planning for future developments of socialism and the labour movement in Germany. (She also helped with the translation of at least one Swedish habilitation dissertation into German, in order to try and support herself financially.) According to one source, by 1919 Duncker felt that she had been greatly aged by her activities and experiences during the First World War. The next few years indicated that her reserves of energy were not yet spent, however.

=== Weimar years ===
The SPD had finally broken apart over the issue of support for the war in 1917. The two principal breakaway movements were the Spartacus League and the Independent Social Democratic Party ("Unabhängige Sozialdemokratische Partei Deutschlands" / USPD). A century later, it is not always easy to differentiate the two movements from each other, and in March 1917 the Spartacus League merged into the USPD while retaining a semi-autonomous status within it. Some of the contradictions inherent in these arrangements were addressed at a conference held in Berlin between 30 December 1918 and 1 January 1919 which gave structure to agreements entered into earlier in the month, in the process establishing the Communist Party of Germany. Hermann and Käte Duncker were among its first members, elected early on to the party central committee.

Käte Duncker returned from Sweden towards the end of 1919 and embarked on a brief series of lectures at the Workers' Education College ("Arbeiterbildungsschule") in Berlin, also supporting herself with translation work. In December 1919, with her husband, she moved back to Thuringia where the family were allocated an apartment in Gotha-Siebleben. 1920 was a difficult year as the region became a focus for the Lüttwitz-Kapp Putsch. In the aftermath of the violence the local left-wing district government resigned and Hermann Duncker, employed by it in a senior secretarial/administrative capacity, lost his job and was obliged to resort to his "fallback occupation" as a peripatetic teacher working for the Communist party, which had a depressive impact on the family.

=== Regional parliament ===
In the late summer of 1921 Duncker invited by the party to stand as a candidate for the regional parliament (Landtag). The candidacy was not without controversy among her political comrades, and at one stage she withdrew it. Nevertheless, in the end her name was on the Communist Party candidate list and in December 1921, now aged fifty, she was elected to the chamber. She addressed her parliamentary responsibilities with characteristic energy, her contributions focusing on issues involving childhood, and building on ideas that had originated during her time as a teacher in Eisenach and Friedrichroda. She campaigned for the introduction of nutritious school meals and of crèche facilities. She urged improvements in the education available to ordinary people. As a result of her truncated teaching career Käte Duncker had become a proponent of the precepts developed by the education pioneer Maria Montessori, which led her to concern herself with enhancements to the professionalism of teacher training.

During a period of on-going internal fractionalism within the Communist Party her parliamentary duties had to be combined with endless national and regional party meetings. The quantity of parliamentary and party work could be exhausting and she suffered several interludes of absence caused by illness.

On top of her other activities, she continued organising women's groups across the region. It is clear from her letters that these meetings, and the lively discussions that often broke out at them, remained very important to her.

Following a further period of unrest, in November 1923 the regional government in Thuringia, which had been a coalition between the SPD and her own Communist group, collapsed. In February 1924 she was not nominated as a candidate in the subsequent election.

=== Twilight years of the Weimar democracy ===
Relations between the Soviet communist party and the German communist party were close during the Weimar years. Between March 1924 and July 1924 Käte Duncker undertook an extended visit to Moscow. By 1926 she was living back in Berlin. Some evidence of her activities and impressions from her first visit to the Soviet Union appeared in her 1927 publication "Women in the Soviet Union" ("Die Frau in der Sowjetunion"). After 1925 she joined with her husband in his teaching work and political journalism, also teaching classes at the Marxist Workers School ("Marxistische Arbeiterschule" / "MASCH") in Berlin.

=== Nazi years and exile ===
Régime change in January 1933 signalled a rapid transition to one-party dictatorship, with communists high on the government enemies' list. Intrusive house searches and book burnings became mainstream. Hermann Duncker was arrested in February 1933 and remained in prison till November 1933. It was, perhaps, a tribute to the vigour with which his wife campaigned for his release from the penitentiary at Brandenburg that by the end of 1933 he was home. He lived under intense police surveillance till 1935 when he managed to escape, initially, to Denmark. The Duncker's elder son, Karl, went into exile in 1935, first to Cambridge in England, and then ending up in the United States. Their younger son, Wolfgang, also went into exile in 1935, relocating with his Swiss-born wife, Erika, to Moscow. During 1936 Käte Duncker moved back from Berlin to Friedrichroda. In November 1936, she emigrated to the United States where she lived in a New York apartment block and was able to find work as a cleaner and as a language teacher. One of her reasons for choosing New York was to be close to her brilliant elder son who was believed to be unwell. The next few years were dominated by family tragedy.

After 1935 her son Wolfgang worked in the movie industry in Moscow. He is described by one source as a follower of Nikolai Bukharin, however. This may or may not be why he was caught up in the purges of the time, disappearing, along with many other German political refugees in Moscow, in 1938. Her elder son was building a career as a notable Gestalt psychologist, by this time based at Swarthmore College near Philadelphia, and a couple of hours by train from New York. There are sources indicating that he had nevertheless been struggling with mental health issue of his own for some year: early in February 1940, shortly after his 37th birthday, following a series of "nervous breakdowns", Karl committed suicide. His mother was badly affected. She was nevertheless able to agitate successfully to obtain a US residence permit for her husband, at this point living precariously in semi-occupied France. He arrived "stateside" in September 1941. By this time Käte Duncker had obtained a job teaching German at a high school.

=== Soviet occupation zone / German Democratic Republic ===
The Dunckers returned to Germany in 1947, settling first in Rostock and later in Bernau, just outside Berlin. Home was now part of the Soviet occupation zone, relaunched in October 1949 as the German Democratic Republic a new separated German state with its political and economic structures modelled on those of the Soviet Union. By now chronically ill, Käte Duncker was no longer politically engaged, and never bothered to sign her communist party membership across to the new Socialist Unity Party ("Sozialistische Einheitspartei Deutschlands" / SED), which, following its creation in April 1946, quickly became the ruling party in a new kind of German one-party dictatorship.

Nevertheless, on 2 June 1948 she wrote to her old friend and comrade, Wilhelm Pieck, imploring him to use his personal influence to find out what had happened to her younger son, Wolfgang. Like him, Wilhelm Pieck had moved to Moscow in 1935; unlike Wolfgang, he had survived, and was now a top German politician in the Soviet occupation zone. (In 1949 he became East Germany's first president.) On 10 November 1948 the Dunckers received a message from the Red Cross informing them that their younger son had died in Vorkuta on 20 November 1942. According to a detailed report submitted by his wife to the Central Committee of the exiled German Communist Party in Moscow on 22 September 1939, Wolfgang had been arrested on 21 March 1938 and interrogated. He had been forced, after four months, to sign a false confession, and then taken to a concentration camp where conditions had been grim. (Wolfgang's widow had survived the war, working in a (military) tank factory, and returned to the Soviet occupation zone in 1945 accompanied by her second husband and her two surviving children.)

Käte Duncker died at Bernau bei Berlin on 2 May 1953. Less than a year earlier she had called in a favour from another old comrade, writing on behalf of her friend, the journalist Jacob Walcher, to Walter Ulbricht. Walcher had been thrown out of the party because of doctrinal differences. It is not known whether Duncker's plea to Ulbricht in 1952 played any part in triggering her friend's formal rehabilitation in 1956.

== Celebration ==
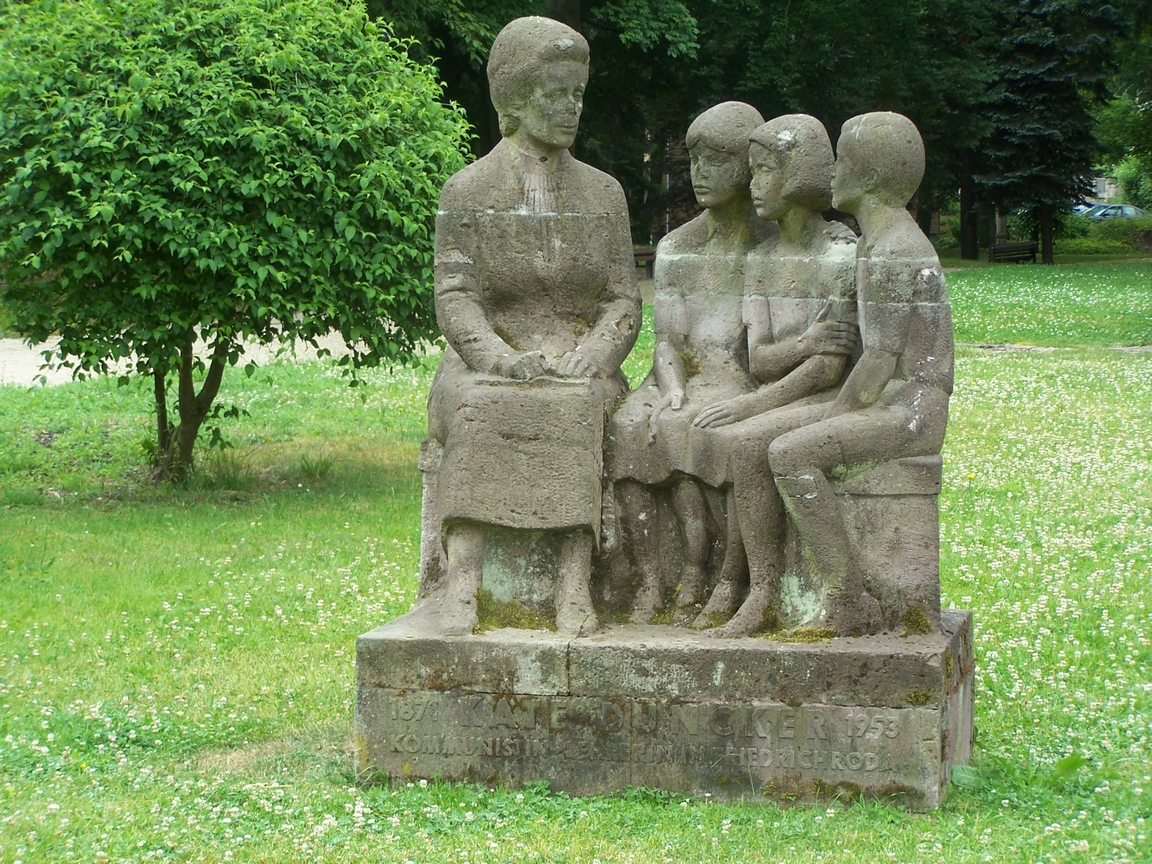
Memorial to Käte Duncker in the public park at Friedrichroda

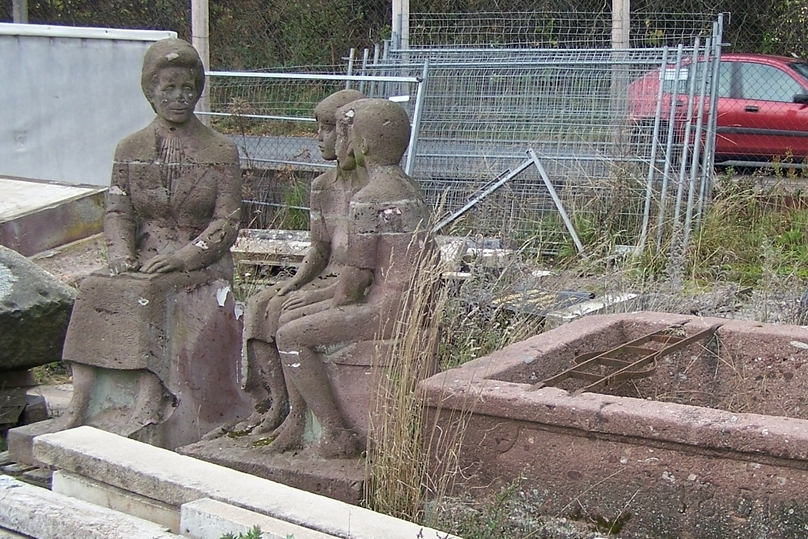
The memorial after being removed from the park in 2009 to clear the way for a new walkway

The East German state needed to find suitable heroes and heroines: Käte Duncker evidently satisfied the criteria. Before 1990 a number of places had streets named after her. In Friedrichroda the street in which her mother had run a small guest house during the closing decades of the nineteenth century became "Käte-Duncker-Straße". Schools, Kindergarten, and even the teachers' training college she had attended in Eisenach were renamed in her honour. As recently as 2013 a mayoral candidate in Hanover was proposing that the street "Walderseestraße" should be renamed as "Käte-Duncker-Straße", as one of four street name changes intended to demonstrate that his city was liberal, progressive, and open to the world, having left its undemocratic national socialist and monarchist days behind.

Inevitably, however, heroes of the German Democratic Republic lost a little of their lustre after the changes that led to the demise of the régime, followed by German reunification in October 1990. In a public park ("Kurpark") in Friedrichroda the memorial statue showing Duncker as a teacher instructing three pupils was removed in 2009 in order to clear the way for a new walkway. The memorial statue was put up again in 2022.

On 15 October 2013 Germany's Die Linke (The Left) party renamed its meeting room at the Regional Parliament in Thuringia (where she sat as a Communist Party member in the 1920s) the "Käte Duncker room" (German: Käte-Duncker-Saal).
