= Wolfgang Duncker =

German film critic and journalist (1909–1942)

- Born: 5 February 1909; Stuttgart, Germany
- Died: 20 November 1942 (aged 33); Vorkutlag, Komi Autonomous Soviet Socialist Republic, Soviet Union
- Occupations: Communist activist journalist film critic
- Spouse: Erika Hartmann-Weiss (1907–2003)
- Children: Boris Duncker
- Parent(s): Hermann Duncker (1874–1960); Käte Duncker (1871–1953)

Wolfgang Duncker (5 February 1909 – 20 November 1942) was a German film critic and journalist. The son of political activist parents, in 1929 he himself joined the Communist Party. After the Hitler government took power at the start of 1933 he emigrated, ending up in Moscow from August 1935. He took Soviet citizenship in August 1937 or January 1938, but was arrested by the security services in March 1938 and accused of spying. Sentencing followed on 8 June 1938. He died "of exhaustion" at the Vorkutlag labour camp 2,500 km / 1,600 miles north-east of Moscow, slightly less than three years after his brother's suicide near New York City. Wolfgang Duncker's Swiss-born widow stayed on, working in a Soviet tank factory, and able to leave the Soviet Union with her two surviving children only at the end of 1945. She returned home to Basel in 1947.

== Biography ==
=== Provenance and an eventful childhood ===
Wolfgang Duncker was born in Stuttgart, the youngest of his parents' three recorded children. Hermann Duncker (1874–1960), his father, was a trades union activist who later became a founder member of the Communist Party and later still became a professor and dean of faculty at the University of Rostock. His mother, Käte Duncker (1871–1953) was also active in education and politics over many years in, successively, imperial Germany, Weimar Germany, New York City and the German Democratic Republic. Wolfgang attended school in Berlin and then Copenhagen between 1915 and 1919. His mother fled to Denmark after the assassinations of Rosa Luxemburg and Karl Liebknecht, but after the most intense phase of the socio-political revolution and economic collapse that followed the war, Wolfgang attended school at Gotha between 1920 and 1923. (His mother was a communist member of the Thüringian regional parliament (Landtag), based at nearby Weimar, at this time.) Between September 1923 and September 1924 he took a year out from school in order to spend a "practical year [working] in agriculture" in Sweden where his parents had friends, and where his mother had previously spent half a year of political exile after her Danish work permit had lapsed, back in May 1919. He then completed his schooling between 1925 and 1929 at the venerable Köllnisches Gymnasium (secondary school) in the Berlin quarter of Neukölln.

=== Politics and journalism ===
Duncker's elder brother, Karl Duncker, reacted against his parents' political passions and grew up to embark on a (tragically short) career as a determinedly apolitical philosopher-psychologist. Wolfgang, however, joined the Young Communists while still at school, probably in 1927. In December 1928 he joined the "Sozialistische Schülerbundes" (loosely, "Socialist school students' association") and during 1929 he joined the Communist Party itself. In May 1929 he enrolled at Berlin's Friedrich-Wilhelm University (as the Humboldt was known before 1949), though it is not clear that he ever completed a degree course there. A few months after joining the Communist Party he was employed by the left-leaning "Berlin am Morgen" (Munzenberg-owned newspaper) to edit the "Entertainment supplement" ("Unterhaltungsbeilage"). Along with the editorial duties, between the end of 1929 and the start of 1933 he contributed several hundred articles of his own on films, stage plays and literature under the pseudonym "Mersus".

=== Erika ===
Early in 1931 Duncker went alone for a stay in Davos, hoping that the famously health-giving high valley air would improve the problems he was having with his lungs. By this time Davos was not merely a health resort but also well established as a winter sports destination. It was expensive and Duncker was unable to afford a hotel room with a mountain view. A sympathetic hotel worker discreetly arranged for him to be smuggled into a more expensive room during the daytime, while the guest who was using it was safely out of the way on the ski slopes. The superior room provided both a view over the mountains and a balcony on which he could sit and gorge himself on the fine mountain air. Nemesis arrived in the form of the room's occupant when she unexpectedly returned early from the slopes and found a strange man sunbathing on her balcony. She asked what he was doing there: surviving sources are silent as to his reply, but the two were married a few months later.

Erika Weiss was a couple of years older than the unexpected visitor in her Davos hotel room. She was Swiss, from a respectable middle-class Basel family. Her parents were not pleased to find themselves having to entrust their daughter's future happiness to a German communist. For Erika the marriage to a foreigner also meant the automatic loss of her Swiss citizenship.

=== Regime change and Swiss exile ===
The Nazi Party took power at the start of 1933 and lost no time in transforming the country into a one-party dictatorship. The communists were, like other political parties, banned: The authorities applied particular rigor to their persecution of those who were or had been members of the Communist Party. The "Berlin am Morgen" (newspaper) was banned, which meant that Wolfgang Duncker found himself without a job and at the back of the queue for any other employment opportunities. Towards the end of January 1933 Wolfgang and Erika relocated to Switzerland where they stayed in a (very) small town called Bachs (Zürich) with Erika's brother, a Protestant pastor. They were not permitted to work, however, since Europe's economy was still reeling from the backwash of the Great Depression and the country's regulated labour market meant that only Swiss nationals were able to work. Desperate to provide for himself and his wife Wolfgang Duncker nevertheless published an article in the left-leaning Basler Zeitung, published across the mountains the west of German-speaking Switzerland. He received a fee of 20 francs. The article was completely apolitical, but his defiance of the work ban nevertheless led to the Dunckers being expelled from the country. There are references to Wolfgang Duncker having attempted to launch himself in a new career as a filmscript writer in Switzerland and/or France in 1933 or 1934, but these came to nothing and in October 1934 the couple returned home to Berlin in Nazi Germany.

=== Soviet exile ===
Attempts to find work in Berlin were again unsuccessful. The country was becoming ever more unwelcoming to those with an interest in politics who were not Hitler supporters. During 1935 Wolfgang's father, who had tried to maintain a low profile while living under intense police surveillance since his release from prison in November 1933, planned his escape to Denmark. His older brother Karl found his academic career in Berlin blocked and escaped to Cambridge, England where Frederic Bartlett welcomed him with a job. (Karl subsequently moved on again, ending up at Swarthmore College in Delaware County, Pennsylvania.) Despite troubling rumours that were beginning to circulate to the contrary, many committed communists like Wolfgang and Erika Duncker still tended to see the Soviet Union as a promised land that showed the route to a better future for mankind. Having failed to find a future in either Germany or Switzerland, the best prospects for the future seemed to lie with a move to Moscow, where other political exiles from Nazi Germany were already starting out on new lives of their own. In August 1935 the Dunckers moved to Moscow where Wolfgang found work with Mezhrabpomfilm ("Межрабпомфильм"), a German-Russian film studio.He worked on the anti-Nazi propaganda film Der Kämpfer (the fighter) with Gustav von Wangenheim, a high-profile aristocratic German film director who had also ended up in Moscow on account of his political beliefs. In Autumn 1936 Duncker obtained what appeared to be a permanent position as a film-cutter with Mosfilm ("Мосфильм").

Boris Duncker, the couple's son, was born on 22 June 1937. In December 1937 or January 1938 Wolfgang Duncker obtained Soviet citizenship. The Dunckers lived in a large Soviet-style multi-occupancy apartment. Those living under the same roof included the international celebrity film director Sergei Eisenstein. Meanwhile, at the top of the Soviet party there was a growing fear, bordering on paranoia, that there might be people in positions of influence who believed that someone else – possibly Leon Trotsky, at this stage living in exile in Norway (later Mexico) – might be a better national leader than Comrade Stalin. The view was not shared by Comrade Stalin, who reacted with a fevered programme of identifying, arresting and removing those identified as possible political opponents and those working for them. Foreigners were particularly suspect. Wolfgang was one of many political exiles from Nazi Germany who had taken refuge in Moscow to be "caught up" in what English language sources identify as the Great Purge ("Большой террор").

=== Arrest and detention ===
Baby Boris was not quite one year old on 23 March 1938 when the security services turned up at the apartment. Rumours had been circulating that Ericka's brother, Frank Weiss, had linked up with a Trotskyite group in Switzerland. However, it was not Erika but Wolfgang Duncker whom they arrested. As Boris Duncker reflected not quite eighty years later, "Justifying the great purge meant there was a need for victims. So [Wolfgang Duncker] became an 'enemy of the people'". (Note: "Für die Säuberungsaktion brauchte es Schuldige. So wurde er zum «Volksfeind»".) Wolfgang was forced to sign a detailed pre-prepared confession and "out himself as a German spy". Erika and the baby were left behind in the Moscow apartment. Wolfgang faced trial on 8 June 1938 and was sentenced to eight years in a labour camp. On 11 August 1938, with around 1,200 others, he was taken by train to the Vorkutlag camp 2,500 km / 1,600 miles north-east of Moscow, and well inside the Arctic Circle.

Wolfgang Duncker's parents were both very much alive at the time of his arrest and transfer to the labour camp. His father, having endured an extended period in an internment camp in Morocco, was able to join his wife in America in September 1941, but was still very ill. Käte Duncker had been living in New York City since the end of 1936. Despite being devastated by the psychiatric illness and 1940 suicide of her other son, she applied her energies to doing what she could for Wolfgang. She was not without contacts. Surviving correspondence includes letters from friends with well placed contacts inside the Soviet academic establishment, undertaking to intercede on Wolfgang's behalf; but for several years such intercessions appeared to have little practical effect on Wolfgang's situation. Then a contact offered to contact Mikhail Kalinin, a Stalin insider who was known to be sympathetic over the plight of the arrested victims of the leader's purge. The same contact made a direct approach to the People's Commissar for Internal Affairs, Lavrentiy Beria himself. It seems to have been the direct approach that triggered a letter that Käte Duncker received from Konstantin Umansky, the Soviet ambassador to Washington. Umansky wrote that her daughter-in-law, Erika Duncker, might visit her husband in the labour camp, and should report back on how his health had been shattered. Käte Duncker's subsequent letter to the ambassador, dated 21 February 1941, survives in the archive. She pleaded that Wolfgang's place of detention might be changed for somewhere less dangerous to his life and health. She reminded the ambassador of the Duncker family's long-standing revolutionary activism and assured him that she would be "unendingly grateful" for his help in giving her son back to his family and so secure for the Moscow-based film industry his talent and dedication. Whatever the ambassador's private thoughts, arranging Wolfgang Duncker's rescue from the arctic labour camp was clearly far beyond his powers. Erika's visit to her husband nevertheless went ahead.

=== Last things ===
In August and September 1939 Erika visited Wolfgang Duncker at the labour camp. The round trip took her approximately a month, travelling by a combination of trucks and trains. She had been allocated two hours but in the end was allowed about five hours with her husband, partly under supervision in the guard room, and partly alone, for what turned out to be their last meeting. She was shocked that her young husband was now ill, aged and emaciated with his front teeth broken, his legs swollen and his complexion pasty and yellowed.

Soon after the visit she remarried. The Soviet authorities had permitted the necessary divorce "at a distance" from an "enemy of the people". Her second husband was also a political exile from Germany, but he had avoided succumbing to the great purge. Wolfgang Duncker died on 20 November 1942, his remaining strength destroyed by four and a half years at the Vorkutlag.

=== The widow and the orphan ===
Erika Hartmann (as she had now become) remained in the Soviet Union with her new husband, surviving despite the hunger. Boris' half-brother, Rainer Hartmann, was born in 1944. After the war they were able to return to Switzerland, but it was many years before the authorities reinstated the Swiss citizenship that she had forfeited when she married a German communist.

=== Rehabilitation ===
War ended in 1945, leaving the western two-thirds of Germany divided into four separate occupation zones. The area surrounding Berlin and the eastern half of the city itself were administered as the Soviet occupation zone (after October 1949 the Soviet sponsored German Democratic Republic (East Germany)). Wolfgang's mother, Käte Duncker, was now on friendly terms with the country's leaders, and it may be because of this that as early as October 1956 Wolfgang Duncker was posthumously rehabilitated by the Socialist Unity Party which was the country's ruling party. In May 1989 he was also posthumously rehabilitated by the Military State Prosecutor of the Soviet Union, following an order from the Supreme Soviet.
