= Hermann Duncker =

German historian and politician

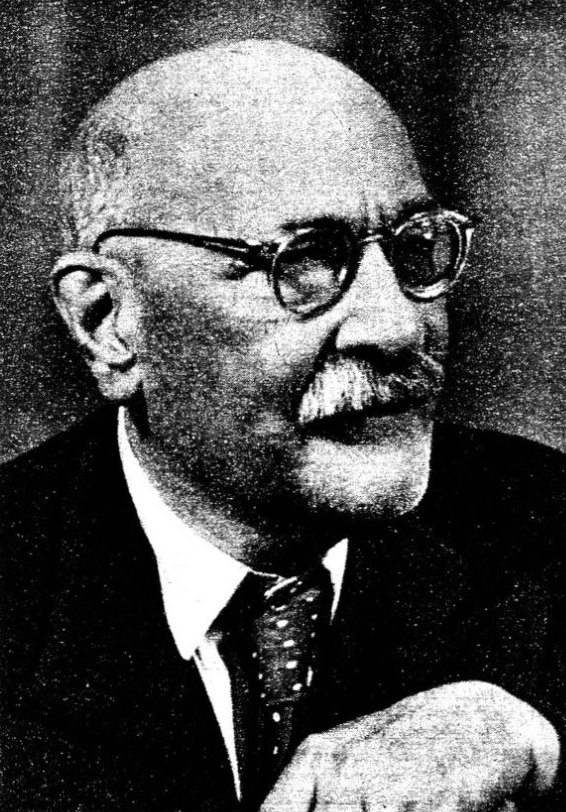
- Duncker c. 1953
- Born: May 24, 1874; Hamburg, German Empire
- Died: June 22, 1960 (aged 86); Bernau bei Berlin, German Democratic Republic
- Resting place: Zentralfriedhof Friedrichsfelde, Berlin
- Education: University of Leipzig; Leipzig Conservatory
- Political party: Socialist Unity Party of Germany (1947–1960); Communist Party of Germany (1919–1947); Social Democratic Party of Germany
- Spouse: Käte Duncker (m. 1898; died 1953)
- Children: Hedwig Duncker; Karl Duncker; Wolfgang Duncker
- Awards: Order of Karl Marx (1953)

Hermann Ludwig Rudolph Duncker (24 May 1874 – 22 June 1960) was a German Marxist politician, historian and social scientist. He was a lecturer for the workers' education movement, co-founder of the Communist Party of Germany, professor at the University of Rostock, and rector of East Germany's trade union academy.

== Biography ==
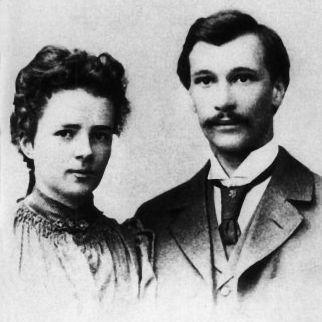
Hermann and his wife Käte c. 1900

Duncker was born in Hamburg as a son of a businessman and teacher. He studied music at the Leipzig Conservatory, then history, economics and philosophy at the University of Leipzig. He joined the Social Democratic Party of Germany (SPD) in 1893. In 1898 he married Käte Duncker (née Döll) who was then a teacher, but also became a socialist politician, journalist and feminist. The couple had three children: daughter Hedwig (1899–1996, physician), and sons Karl (1903–1940, Gestalt psychologist) and Wolfgang (1909–1942, journalist and film critic).

In 1900, Duncker started teaching at the Leipzig workers' educational association. In 1903 he completed his Ph.D. under supervision of Karl Bücher and Karl Lamprecht. In the same year, Duncker became a journalist at the SPD-affiliated Leipziger Volkszeitung. In 1904, he founded a "workers' secretariat" (information and advice centre for the labour movement) in Leipzig, and in the following year in Dresden. In 1907, the family moved to Stuttgart from where Hermann Duncker toured the country as an itinerant teacher for workers' education.

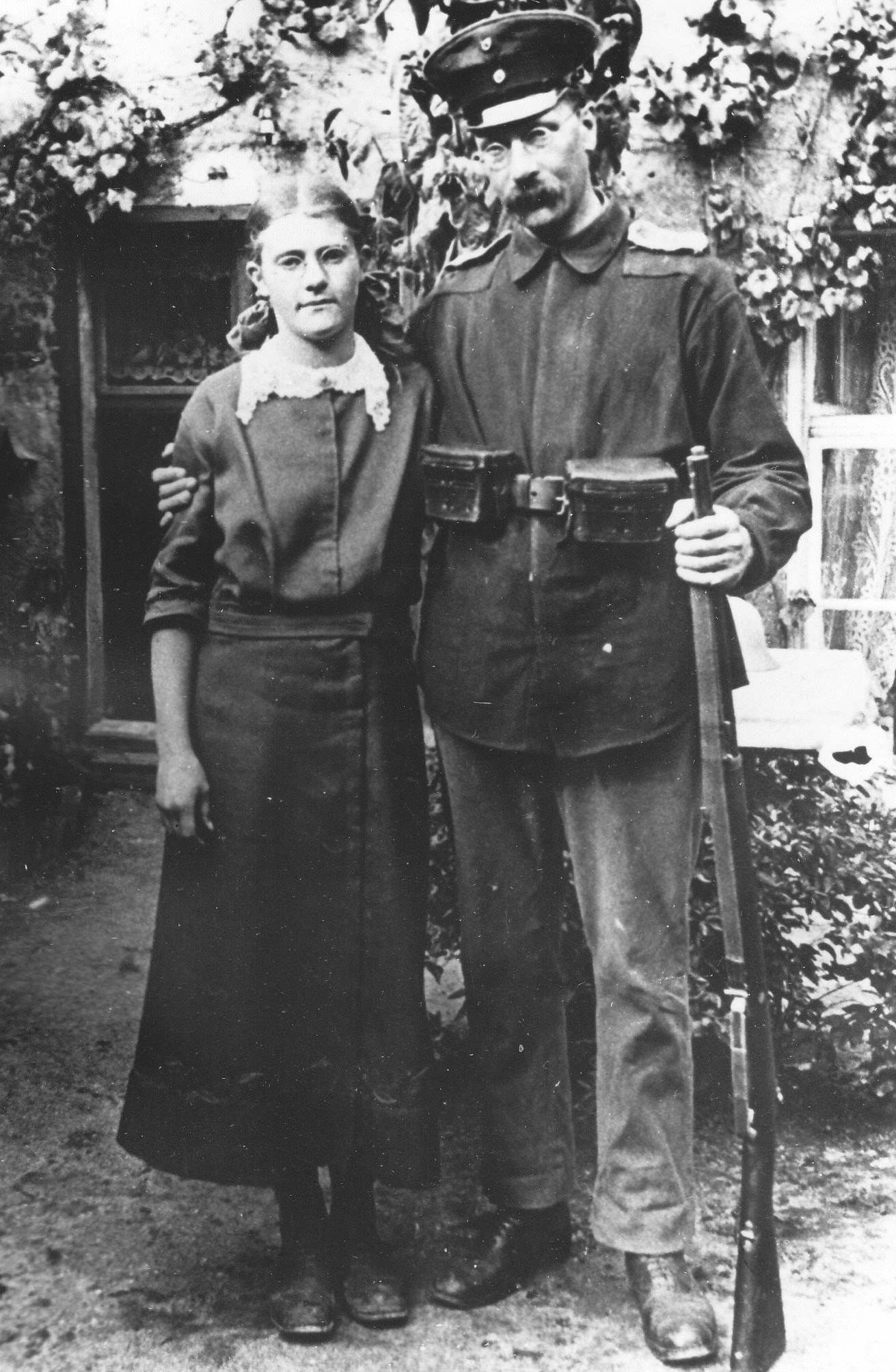
Duncker in uniform with his daughter Hedwig in 1915

During the First World War, Hermann and Käte Duncker were protagonists of the SPD's leftist, internationalist and pacifist wing, though Hermann was forced into military service from 1915 to 1918. Together with Karl Liebknecht, Rosa Luxemburg and Clara Zetkin they were among the founders of the Spartacus League that became the Communist Party of Germany (KPD) during the German Revolution of 1918–1919. Both Käte and Hermann Duncker were elected to the KPD's first central committee. He resumed his lecture tours and directed KPD schools on the regional and national level. In 1925 he co-founded the Berlin Marxist Workers' School. In the KPD central committee he was responsible for education and instruction. He represented the relatively moderate "Middle Group" within the party that aimed for a united front with the Social Democrats. Therefore, he was sidelined from the radicalising party leadership after 1929.

After the Nazis' seizure of power, Duncker, like most communist leaders, was taken into "protective custody" in February 1933, but he was released in November of the same year. In 1936 he emigrated to Denmark, then to England and France. Duncker was distraught over the persecution of his son Wolfgang who was a comrade and friend Nikolai Bukharin during Stalin's Great Purge in the Soviet Union (Wolfgang died at Vorkutlag in 1942, but his parents were uncertain about his fate until 1948). Duncker also fell out with the KPD's Moscow leadership over the Molotov–Ribbentrop Pact between the Soviet Union and Nazi Germany, which he strongly opposed.

Käte Duncker had fled to the United States, living with their son Karl who suffered from depression and committed suicide in 1940. When the German Wehrmacht invaded France in the summer of 1940, Hermann Duncker fled from Paris to Vichy France's so-called zone libre. His wife organised a visa for his entry to the United States in late 1940. During a stopover in Casablanca (French Morocco), he was temporarily detained, and only arrived in New York in September 1941. In the US, Duncker joined the Council for a Democratic Germany in 1944.

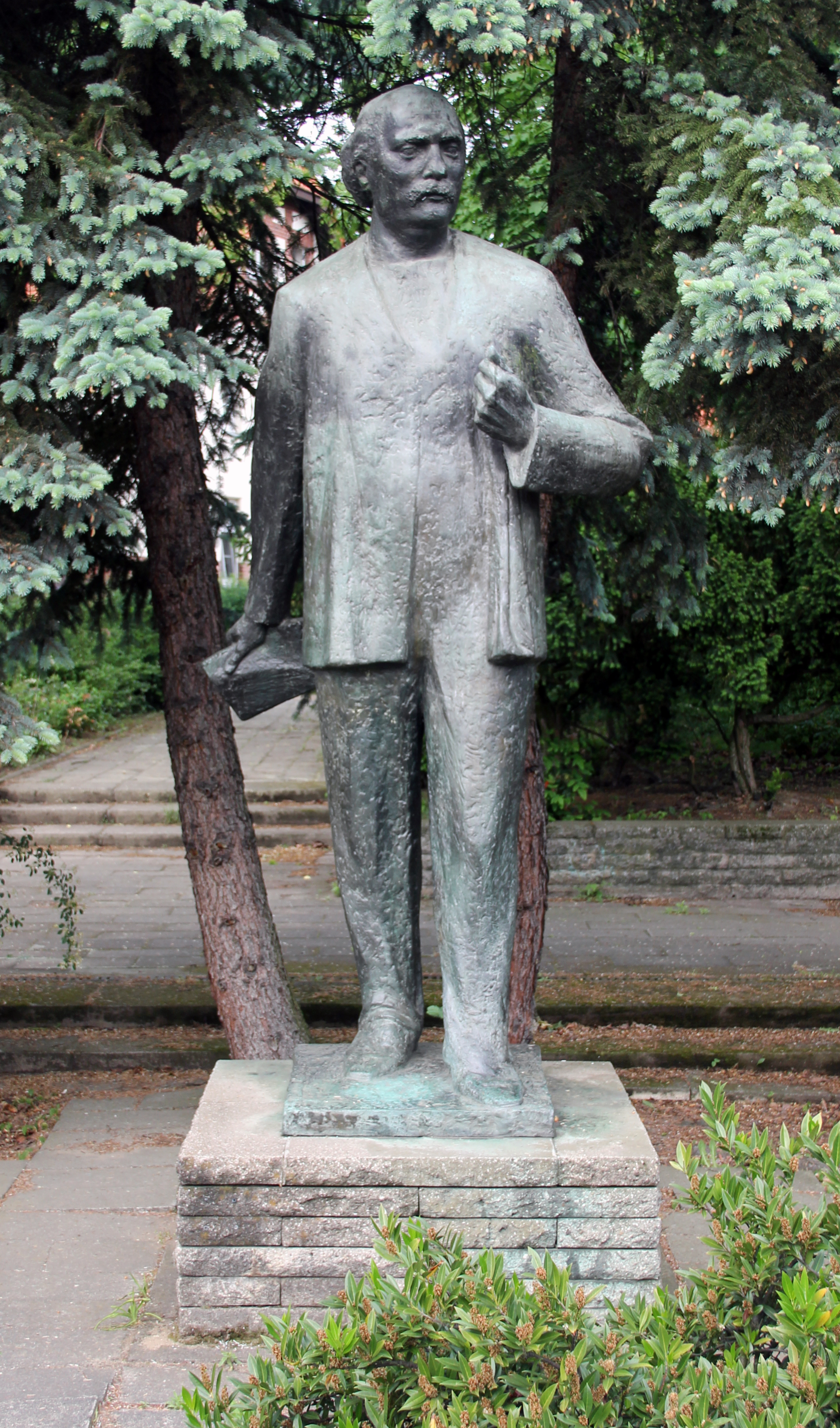
Statue of Hermann Duncker in Berlin-Karlshorst

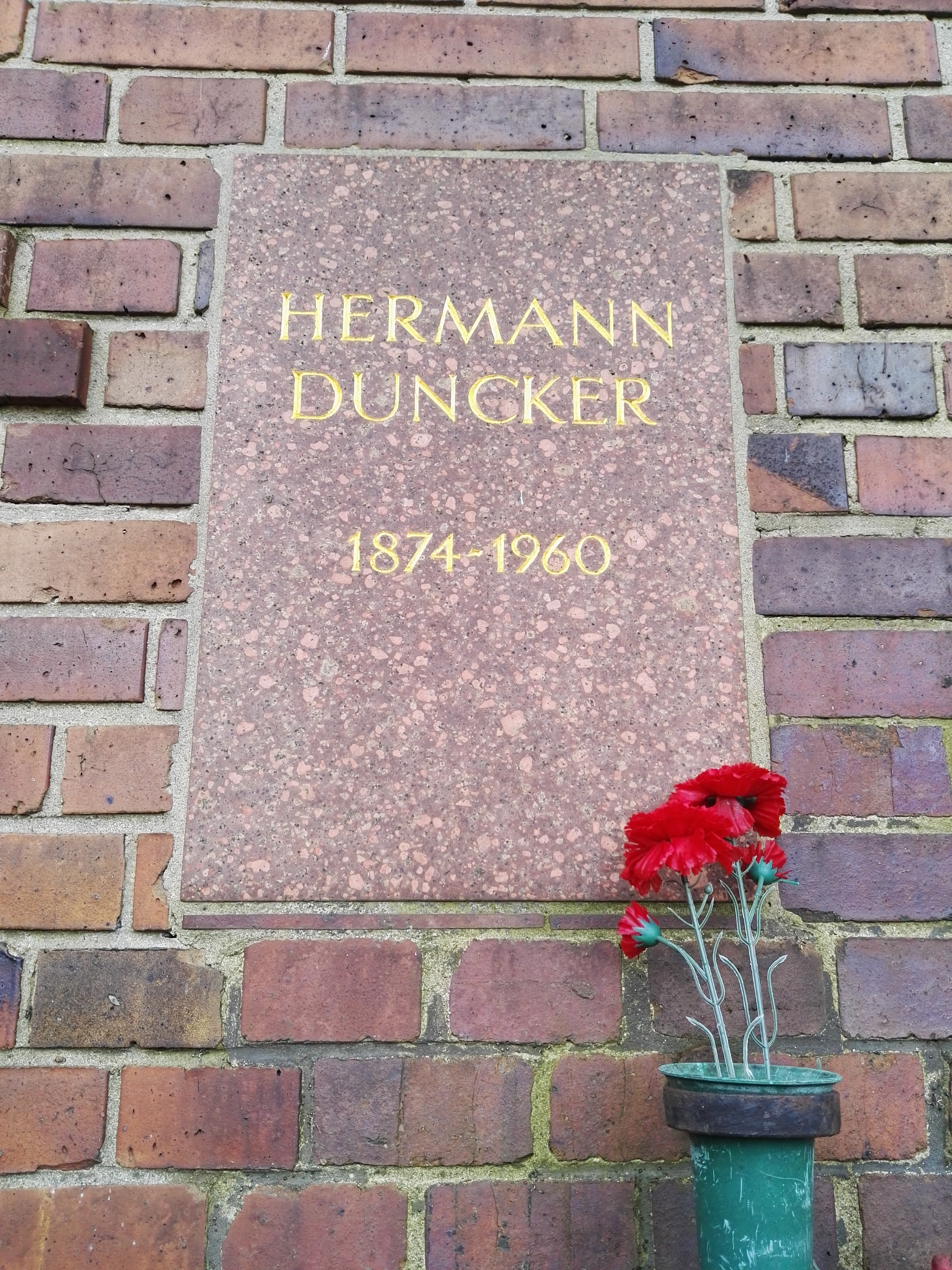
Grave of Hermann Duncker at the Memorial to the Socialists, Friedrichsfelde Central Cemetery

After the end of the war, Käte and Hermann Duncker returned to Germany (Soviet occupation zone) in May 1947. He joined the ruling Socialist Unity Party of Germany (SED; created in April 1946 by the forced merger of KPD and SPD). In the same year he was appointed professor at the University of Rostock, teaching history of social movements, and dean of the faculty of social sciences. He became rector of the Free German Trade Union Federation (FDGB) academy in Bernau bei Berlin in 1949. Almost blind by that time, he held that position until his death. From 1955 to 1960 he was also a member of the East German trade union federation's executive board.

Duncker was awarded the Order of Karl Marx (highest decoration of the GDR) in 1953, an honorary doctorate of the University of Leipzig in 1954 and the highest class of the Patriotic Order of Merit in 1955. He was buried near the Memorial to the Socialists at the Berlin Friedrichsfelde central cemetery.
