= Milton Balkany =

American rabbi and extortionist

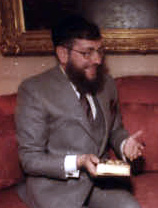
- Milton Balkany in 1981
- Born: 1946 (age 79–80); Detroit, Michigan
- Occupation: Rabbi

Milton Yehoshua Balkany (born 1946) is an American Orthodox Jewish, past director of the Jewish girls′ school Bais Yaakov of Midwood, conservative political activist and fundraiser from Brooklyn, New York, dubbed "the Brooklyn Bundler."

== Early life ==
Balkany was born in Detroit, where his father was a stock manager for General Motors and his mother worked as a typist. He left public school and went to a local yeshiva, and later with a scholarship to Torah Vodaath, a yeshiva in Brooklyn, New York.

== Family ==
Balkany is married to Sarah Rubashkin with whom he has 13 children. They live in Borough Park, Brooklyn. His father-in-law was Aaron Rubashkin, a Lubavitcher hasidic Brooklyn butcher and the founder of the now bankrupt slaughterhouse and meat-packaging factory Agriprocessors based in Postville, Iowa.

== Activities ==
In September 1960, Balkany founded Bais Yaakov of Brooklyn, now Bais Yaakov of Midwood, a strictly orthodox girls′ school in Borough Park, and served as its dean. A conservative Republican, he has been active in political fundraising since the early 1980s, mainly for Republican politicians, and has also often acted as a lobbyist for various Jewish causes. Dubbed "the Brooklyn Bundler," he had a reputation as someone who had access not only to elected officials but to several government agencies as well. For several years, he gave the invocation at an annual dinner honoring President Ronald Reagan, and was offered to become the rabbi chaplain of the Senate, an offer he declined. He became widely known for giving public religious benedictions (Brachot) to senior politicians at city council, state legislature, and Congress, where he served as guest chaplain in June 2003, opening the U.S. Senate and the U.S. House of Representatives with the prayer "I stand here today among the jewels of our nation, men and women who are precious, who radiate dedication, and they have been selected as the leaders of our land."

== Controversies ==
=== Yeshiva Rav Isacshon ===
In 1987 Balkany became embroiled in a scandal after soliciting politicians to approve a $1.8 million grant from the Department of Health and Human Services to Yeshiva Rav Isacshon to acquire a building in Los Angeles. Department officials later asked for the return of the money to the government.

=== Prison lobbying ===
Balkany has also lobbied the U.S. Bureau of Prisons to improve conditions for Orthodox Jewish prisoners. According to the Village Voice, several people who have dealt with him say that he has claimed the power to arrange favorable treatment in prison for individuals such as Leona Helmsley and Eddie Antar. In 2004, he was banned from making any contact with prison service officials. As part of the deal with prosecutors of the charity fund pilfering scandal he agreed not to lobby on "any matter involving a federal inmate or any other person charged or convicted of a federal crime." Prosecutors alleged that he would ensure favorable prison conditions for Jewish prisoners in exchange for money of donations to his charities. After he arranged a brief prison release for Helmsley so that she could visit family members' graves before Yom Kippur, the billionaire made a contribution to Balkany's school.

=== David Luchins ===
In 1994, Balkany tried to have David Luchins, an Orthodox Jew, official of the Orthodox Union, self-described liberal, and then aide to Senator Daniel Moynihan excommunicated by a Jewish religious court, blaming him for having "caused yeshivas in the land of Israel to lose money." Moynihan refused to allow Luchins to attend the hearing. Balkany told the press that "We have grave concern with a lot of things he is doing in the Jewish community under the auspices of being a senior staff member of Sen. Moynihan's, whenever an issue comes to his attention, he gets involved and does great harm. He's hurting individuals and hurting communities, he thinks he has a direct link to Sinai. I haven't accepted his word as God's word yet." Luchins responded that "Jewish tradition says that every Jewish soul was at Sinai, and I assume Rabbi Balkany's was there also. We may not have met because he might have been in the back, collecting money."

In March 1995, a Rabbinic Court met at Yeshiva University at Rabbi Ahron Soloveichik's suggestion to hear Balkany's charges against Luchins. The court, consisting of three highly respected Yeshiva University Roshei Yeshiva, dismissed all charges against Luchins.

=== Bob Dole ===
In 1996 a request for $2.8 million in federal funding for a charitable project Balkany supported was accepted after then-U.S. Senator Bob Dole interceded on its behalf. Dole had been a beneficiary of Balkany's political fundraising and got involved after the proposal had first been rejected by the U.S. Agency for International Development (AID). The request was in relation to funding to set up computer training programs in Russia, run by the Yeshiva Ohr Torah of Rabbi Shlomo Riskin, a controversial rabbi in the Israeli occupied West Bank. Despite the fast-tracking of the payment following an AID meeting with Dole, both Dole and AID denied that there was any excessive influence exacted on the organisation by the then Senate Majority Leader on Balkany's behalf.

Balkany subsequently sued Riskin in a Beit Din for $200,000 over non-payment of fees related to his activism on his behalf. Riskin argued that he had never asked Balkany to intercede with Dole on his behalf and refused to attend the hearings.

=== Katherine Harris ===
In January 2005, there was some controversy over donations made to Katherine Harris by members of Balkany's extended family including the CEO of Agriprocessors. Harris refused to return the donations organised by Balkany after being made aware of the 2003 prosecution against Balkany and the PETA investigation into allegations of animal cruelty at Agriprocessors.

=== Daycare vouchers ===
Balkany became a key figure in the distribution of day-care vouchers in New York due to his close ties with Rudy Giuliani and top-aide Bruce Teitelbaum. According to reports in the Daily News, Balkany helped corral for Orthodox Jewish schools more than half the city's total allocation of vouchers. Balkany offered a full-service operation, charging families a fee to fill out applications for the vouchers, which were in desperate demand all over the city. Nicholas Scoppetta, at the time serving as commissioner for children's services, was sufficiently disturbed by events to refer the matter to the city's Department of Investigation, which opened a probe that was later joined by federal investigators.

== Criminal charges and trials ==
=== Misappropriation of charitable funds ===
On August 26, 2003, the US Attorney for the Southern District of New York, announced that Balkany had been detained on charges that he misappropriated approximately $700,000 in federal grant money.

Balkany as the President and Director of Bais Yaakov, a Jewish day school in Brooklyn, applied for, in November 1999, and later received a $700,000 Congressional "Economic Development Initiative" grant administered through the auspices of the United States Department of Housing and Urban Development. According to the Complaint, he said that the entire grant amount would be used to pay off a mortgage on a building located on the Bais Yaakov property for an entity called "the Children's Center of Brooklyn" to house educational and therapeutic programs for disabled preschool children.

In November 2001, auditors began a preliminary investigation of a number of "Economic Development Initiative" grants that had been awarded in the New York metropolitan area, including the $700,000 "Children's Center" grant. In connection with the investigation, auditors allegedly learned that the "Children's Center" had failed to file any of the regular progress reports required under rules and procedures of the grant. When auditors interviewed Balkany, he insisted the funds had been used to convert a Bais Yaakov building into the "Children's Center" but he refused to provide the auditors with access to the school's books and records, according to the Complaint.

Subsequently, investigators obtained records for the Bais Yaakov account at Chase Manhattan Bank into which the grant money had been deposited. Those records reflected that all of the money received from HUD in December 1999 had been withdrawn from the account by early February 2000, a two-month period in which Balkany wrote more than 250 checks drawn against the account. According to the Complaint, further investigation revealed that only one check, for approximately $6000, was used to pay down any of the pending mortgages against the Bais Yaakov property, which at the time of the grant totaled more than $1 million.

Balkany diverted the funds to an array of individuals and entities who were not entitled to the earmarked funds. He diverted $300,000 to an Israeli corporation in which his son-in-law was an officer, and another $5,000 to a New York import company run by another son-in-law. He also diverted approximately $80,000 to a variety of other rabbis and Jewish schools and organizations located in Brooklyn. He also wrote out 32 checks against the Bais Yaakov account, totaling approximately $78,000, all made payable to "Rabbi Balkany" which were subsequently endorsed and either cashed or deposited into a personal account at another bank. He also used thousands of dollars in grant funds to pay for personal items such as life insurance premiums; credit card bills and income taxes.

Balkany was charged in the Complaint with theft of government property, filing a false claim, wire fraud and obstruction of justice and released on a bond of $750,000.

In a deal with prosecutors in 2004, Balkany agreed to restrictions on his movement, six months probation, full restitution of the monies and admitted that he was wrong in not complying with specific terms of the grant's use. In return the State Prosecutor's Office promised not to pursue the case.

=== Hedge fund extortion ===
On February 18, 2010, Balkany was arrested and charged with extortion, blackmail, wire fraud and making false statements in a Federal Court in Manhattan. The hedge fund involved was SAC Capital. Balkany received two checks totalling $3.25 million and was arrested shortly after. The complaint filed reported that he claimed that he could prevent a federal prisoner from telling U.S. authorities about alleged insider trading at the firm. According to court records, Balkany told an investigator with U.S. Attorney Preet Bharara′s Manhattan office in a conversation recorded by prosecutors, that SAC had inside tips about two companies which make medical devices and a company which makes molecular diagnostic products. SAC, which has since been riddled with insider trading convictions, had a SAC lawyer alert prosecutors to the extortion attempt, and a prosecutor said during the trial that Balkany "lied" and that there was no evidence of illegal trades. This was later proven untrue. SAC was involved in multi insider trading convictions and investigations. In February 2011, two former employees were charged with insider trading.

Balkany's assertions were further proven correct when in November 2012 federal prosecutors levied charges against additional former SAC Capital traders. Portfolio manager Michael Steinberg was arrested in March 2013 and accused of using inside information to make $1.4 million in profits for SAC Capital. In June 2013 nine former SAC employees were charged with conspiracy and securities fraud. With the conviction of Mathew Martoma on February 6, 2014 after a speedy four week trial, a total of eight former SAC Capital employees have been found guilty.

Despite these future disclosers which would support Rabbi Balkany, on November 10, 2010, Balkany was found guilty of all charges. On February 18, 2011 he was sentenced to four years in prison. In March 2012 Balkany appealed his conviction, claiming that he should be allowed to present an entrapment defense. The appeal was rejected and the original conviction upheld by the U.S. Second Circuit Court of Appeals.

He was partially released on Wednesday 9/4/13.
