= XY problem =

Problem of communication when asking for help

The XY problem is a communication problem encountered in help desk, technical support, software engineering, or customer service situations where the question is about an end user's attempted solution (X) rather than the root problem itself (Y).

The XY problem obscures the real issues and may even introduce secondary problems that lead to miscommunication, resource mismanagement, and sub-par solutions. The solution for the support personnel is to ask probing questions as to why the information is needed in order to identify the root problem Y and redirect the end user away from an unproductive path of inquiry.

== Terminology ==
The term XY problem was implicitly coined by Eric S. Raymond in How To Ask Questions The Smart Way when he wrote "How can I use X to do Y?" in the "Questions Not To Ask" section:

Q: How can I use X to do Y?
A: If what you want is to do Y, you should ask that question without pre-supposing the use of a method that may not be appropriate. Questions of this form often indicate a person who is not merely ignorant about X, but confused about what problem Y they are solving and too fixated on the details of their particular situation.

== See also ==
- Attribute substitution – Type of cognitive bias involving substitution of an easy problem in place of a hard problem
- Einstellung effect – Predisposition to solve a problem in a specific manner even though better methods exist
- Garbage in, garbage out – Paraphrased: a bad question leads to a bad answer
- Type III error – Getting the right answer for the wrong reason
- Law of the instrument – "If all you have is a hammer, everything looks like a nail"
