= Karl Duncker =

German psychologist

Karl Duncker (2 February 1903 in Leipzig – 23 February 1940) was a German Gestalt psychologist. He attended Friedrich-Wilhelms-University from 1923 to 1923, and spent 1925–1926 at Clark University in Worcester, MA as a visiting professor, where, in 1926, he received a master in arts degree. Until 1935 he was a student and assistant of the founders of Gestalt psychology in Berlin: Max Wertheimer, Wolfgang Köhler and Kurt Koffka. In 1935, exiled by the Nazis, he got an assistantship in Cambridge with Frederic Charles Bartlett and later emigrated to the US, where he was again an assistant of Wolfgang Köhler's at Swarthmore College. Duncker died by suicide in 1940 at 37 years of age having suffered from professionally treated depression for some time.

His younger brother Wolfgang Duncker (1909–1942), a communist in exile in Moscow, was arrested in 1938 during the Great Purges and died in the Gulag. Their parents were the well-known socialist and later communist politicians and educators Hermann and Käte Duncker.

== Achievements ==
Duncker coined the term functional fixedness for describing the difficulties in visual perception and in problem solving that arise from the fact that one element of a whole situation already has a (fixed) function which has to be changed in order to find the correct perception and/or the solution to a problem.

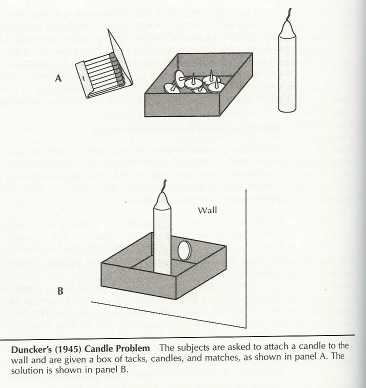
The candle problem (Karl Duncker, 1945).

In Duncker's "candle problem" the situation was defined by the objects: a candle, a box of thumb-tacks and a book of matches. The task was to fix the candle on the wall without any additional elements. The difficulty of this problem arises from the functional fixedness of the box, which originally contained thumb-tacks. It is a container in the problem situation but must be used as a shelf in the solution situation.

Other examples for this type of mental restructuring are:

- an electromagnet must be used as part of a pendulum
- a branch of a tree must be used as a tool
- a brick must be used as a paper weight
- another meaning of a word must be found that is different from the meaning within the context of the sentence

== Publications ==
- Duncker, Karl (1926). "A Qualitative (Experimental and Theoretical) Study of Productive Thinking (Solving of Comprehensible Problems)". Pedagogical Seminary and Journal of Genetic Psychology. 33 (4): 642–708. doi:10.1080/08856559.1926.10533052. ISSN 0885-6559.
- Duncker, Karl (1929). "Über induzierte Bewegung (Ein Beitrag zur Theorie optisch wahrgenommener Bewegung)" [Concerning Induced Movement (A contribution to the theory of visually perceived movement)]. Psychologische Forschung. 12 (1): 180–259. doi:10.1007/BF02409210. ISSN 0033-3026. S2CID 143007951.
- Duncker, Karl (1932). "Behaviorismus und Gestaltpsychologie" [Behaviorism and Gestalt Psychology]. Erkenntnis. 3 (1): 162–176. doi:10.1007/BF01886416. ISSN 0165-0106. S2CID 123234168.
- Duncker, Karl (1935). Zur Psychologie des produktiven Denkens [Psychology of Productive Thinking]. Springer. OCLC 6677283.
- Duncker, Karl (1936). "Lernen und Einsicht im Dienst der Zielerreichung" [Learning and Insight for Reaching Goals]. Acta Psychologica. 1: 77–82. doi:10.1016/S0001-6918(36)90037-9. ISSN 0001-6918.
- Duncker, Karl (1937). "Some Preliminary Experiments on the Mutual Influence of Pains". Psychologische Forschung. 21 (1): 311–326. doi:10.1007/BF02441209. ISSN 0033-3026. S2CID 143212348.
- Duncker, Karl (1938). "Experimental Modification of Children's Food Preferences through Social Suggestion". Journal of Abnormal and Social Psychology. 33 (4): 489–507. doi:10.1037/h0056660.
- Duncker, Karl (1939). "The Influence of Past Experience upon Perceptual Properties". American Journal of Psychology. 52 (2): 255–265. doi:10.2307/1416111. ISSN 0002-9556. JSTOR 1416111.
- Duncker, Karl (1939). "Ethical Relativity? An Enquiry into the Psychology of Ethics". Mind. 48 (189): 39–57. doi:10.1093/mind/XLVIII.189.39. ISSN 0026-4423.
- Duncker, Karl; Krechevsky, I. (1939). "On Solution-achievement". Psychological Review. 3 (2): 162–176. doi:10.1037/h0060101. ISSN 0033-295X.
- Duncker, Karl (1941). "On Pleasure, Emotion, and Striving". Philosophy and Phenomenological Research. 1 (4): 391–430. doi:10.2307/2103143. ISSN 0031-8205. JSTOR 2103143. (also online at The International Society for Gestalt Theory and Its Applications)
- Duncker, Karl (1945). On Problem Solving. Psychological Monographs. Vol. 58. American Psychological Association. OCLC 968793.
