= Candle problem =

Cognitive performance test

The candle problem or candle task, also known as Duncker's candle problem, is a cognitive performance test, measuring the influence of functional fixedness on a participant's problem solving capabilities. The test was created by Gestalt psychologist Karl Duncker and published by him in 1935. Duncker originally presented this test in his 1926 thesis on problem-solving tasks at Clark University.

== Problem ==
The test presents the participant with the following task: how to fix and light a candle on a wall (a cork board) in a way so the candle wax won't drip onto the table below. To do so, one may only use the following along with the candle:

- a book of matches
- a box of thumbtacks

== Solution ==
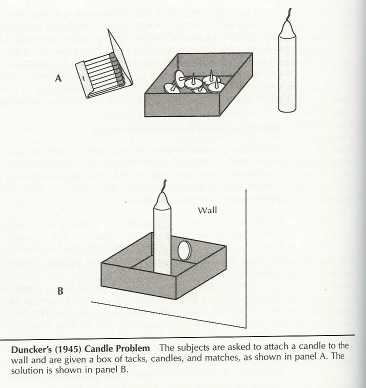
The candle problem

The most efficient solution is to empty the box of thumbtacks, use the thumbtacks to nail the box to the wall, put the candle into the box, and light the candle with the match. The concept of functional fixedness predicts that the participant will only see the box as a device to hold the thumbtacks and not immediately perceive it as a separate and functional component available to be used in solving the task.

== Response ==
Many of the people who attempted the test explored other creative, but less efficient, methods to achieve the goal. For example, some tried to tack the candle to the wall without using the thumbtack box, and others attempted to melt some of the candle's wax and use it as an adhesive to stick the candle to the wall. Neither method works. However, if the task is presented with the tacks piled next to the box (rather than inside it), virtually all of the participants were shown to achieve the optimal solution, which is self defined.

The test has been given to numerous people, including M.B.A. students at the Kellogg School of Management in a study investigating whether living abroad and creativity are linked.

== Glucksberg ==
Glucksberg (1962) used a 2 × 2 design manipulating whether the tacks and matches were inside or outside of their boxes and whether subjects were offered cash prizes for completing the task quickly. Subjects who were offered no prize, termed low-drive, were told "We are doing pilot work on various problems in order to decide which will be the best ones to use in an experiment we plan to do later. We would like to obtain norms on the time needed to solve." The remaining subjects, termed high-drive, were told "Depending on how quickly you solve the problem you can win $5.00 or $20.00. The top 25% of the Ss [subjects] in your group will win $5.00 each; the best will receive $20.00. Time to solve will be the criterion used." (As a note, adjusting for inflation since 1962, the study's publish year, the amounts in 2025 dollars would be approximately $53 and $213, respectively.) The empty-boxes condition was found to be easier than the filled-boxes condition: more subjects solved the problem, and those who did solve the problem solved it faster. Within the filled-boxes condition, high-drive subjects performed worse than low-drive subjects. Glucksberg interpreted this result in terms of "neobehavioristic drive theory": "high drive prolongs extinction of the dominant habit and thus retards the correct habit from gaining ascendancy". An explanation in terms of the overjustification effect is made difficult by the lack of a main effect for drive and by a nonsignificant trend in the opposite direction within the empty-boxes condition.

Another way to explain the higher levels of failure during the high-drive condition is that the process of turning the task into a competition for limited resources can create mild levels of stress in the subject, which can lead to a sympathetic nervous system response known as fight-or-flight. This stress response effectively shuts down the creative thinking and problem solving areas of the brain in the prefrontal cortex.

== Linguistic implications ==
E. Tory Higgins and W. M. Chaires found that having subjects repeat the names of common pairs of objects in this test, but in a different and unaccustomed linguistic structure, such as "box and tacks" instead of "box of tacks", facilitated performance on the candle problem. This phrasing helps one to distinguish the two entities as different and more accessible.

In a written version of the task given to people at Stanford University, Michael C. Frank and language acquisition researcher Michael Ramscar reported that simply underlining certain relevant materials ("on the table there is a candle, a box of tacks, and a book of matches...") increases the number of candle-problem solvers from 25% to 50%.
