= Edith Hirsch Luchins =

Polish-American mathematician

- Born: December 21, 1921; Brzeziny, Poland
- Died: November 18, 2002 (aged 80); Suffern, New York, United States
- Education: Brooklyn College; New York University; University of Oregon
- Known for: Luchins and Luchins' Water Jar Experiment
- Scientific career
- Fields: Mathematics; Psychology
- Workplaces: Rensselaer Polytechnic Institute
- Doctoral advisor: Bertram Yood

Edith Hirsch Luchins (21 December 1921 in Brzeziny, Poland – 18 November 2002 in Suffern, New York) was a Polish-American mathematician. Her work focused on applying mathematical principles to problems in the philosophy of science and psychology, most notably in the field of Gestalt psychology. The Luchins and Luchins' Water Jar Experiment is named after her and her husband psychologist Abraham S. Luchins.

== Early life and education ==
Edith Hirsch was born in 1921 in Poland. She emigrated to the United States at age six, settling with her family in New York City. In high school Hirsch excelled at mathematics, tutoring other students and assisting teachers with grading. She earned her B.A from Brooklyn College in 1942 and her M.A. from NYU in 1944. She obtained her Ph.D. from University of Oregon in 1957 with her dissertation "On Some Properties of Certain Banach Algebras."

== Career ==
From 1942 to 1943, Luchins worked for the government as an inspector of anti-aircraft equipment at Sperry Gyroscope during World War II. Luchins began her doctoral studies at NYU under Kurt Friedrichs and Richard Courant as she began her teaching career at Brooklyn College. She put her formal studies on hold for several years for personal reasons; however, she continued to conduct research and publish papers in educational mathematics alongside her academic husband.

After obtaining her doctorate in 1957, Luchins again pursued teaching, teaching for four years at the University of Miami before being appointed as an associate professor at Rensselaer Polytechnic in 1962. In 1970, she became the first female full professor at Rensselaer, where she remained until her retirement in 1992.

== Awards and achievements ==
Luchins' success in teaching and advising students was recognized throughout her career by the Rensselaer Distinguished Teaching Award, the Darrin Counseling Award, the Martin Luther King Jr Award, and the Rensselaer Alumni Association Outstanding Faculty Award. She was named a Fellow of the American Association for the Advancement of Science in 1982. In 1998, Luchins accepted an honorary membership in the Society for Gestalt Theory and its Applications.

== Personal life ==
In 1942 she married Abraham Luchins, an educational psychologist. The couple had five children together.

== Selected publications ==
- 1947 (with Abraham S. Luchins): A Structural Approach to the Teaching of the Concept of Area in Intuitive Geometry
- 1953 (with Abraham S. Luchins): The Satiation Theory of Figural After-Effects and Gestalt Principles of Perception
- 1959 (with Abraham S. Luchins): Rigidity of Behavior - A Variational Approach to the Effect of Einstellung. University of Oregon Books: Eugene, Oregon.
- 1965 (with Abraham S. Luchins): Logical Foundations of Mathematics for Behavioral Scientists. Holt, Rinehart: New York.
- 1969 (with Abraham S. Luchins): The Search for Factors that Extremize the Autokinetic Effect. Faculty-Student Association: State University of New York at Albany.
- 1979: Sex Differences in Mathematics: How Not to Deal with Them. American Mathematical Monthly.
