= Abraham S. Luchins =

American Gestalt psychologist

Abraham S. Luchins (March 8, 1914 – December 27, 2005) was an American Gestalt psychologist and a pioneer of group psychotherapy. He was born in Brooklyn, New York and died in New York.

== Biography ==
Luchins was a student and staff member of Max Wertheimer, the main originator of Gestalt psychology. After Max Wertheimer fled to the US and started lecturing at the New School for Social Research, Luchins worked as his assistant and became one of his closest collaborators from 1936 till 1942. In the 1970s he and his wife Edith Hirsch published a series of transcripts and reports on Wertheimer's advanced seminars and workshops.

He researched the role of a mental set (Einstellung effect) in the use of the various water jar refill problems. The goal was to learn to what extent the successful use of a problem solving strategy has a negative effect when the task cannot be solved by the previous strategy.

Other fields of research were group psychotherapy and research methods and strategies.

Luchins lectured at Yeshiva University (New York), McGill University (Montreal), the University of Oregon, the University of Miami. From 1962 on he was professor of psychology at the University at Albany, State University of New York and professor emeritus from 1984.

In 1993 he became an honorary member of the international Society for Gestalt Theory and its Applications (GTA) - Gesellschaft für Gestalttheorie und ihre Anwendungen (GTA).

== Main publications ==
Books

- 1942: Mechanization in problem solving. In: Psychological Monographs 34, APA: Washington.
- 1959: A Functional Approach To Training In Clinical Psychology. Thomas: Springfield.
- 1959 (with Edith H. Luchins): Rigidity of Behavior - A Variational Approach to the Effect of Einstellung. University of Oregon Books: Eugene, Oregon.
- 1964: Group Therapy - A Guide. Random House: New York (Portuguese edition 1970, Spanish edition 1984).
- 1965 (with E.H. Luchins): Logical Foundations of Mathematics for Behavioral Scientists. Holt, Rinehart: New York.
- 1969 (with E.H. Luchins): The Search for Factors that Extremize the Autokinetic Effect. Faculty-Student Association: State University of New York at Albany.
- 1970 (with E.H. Luchins): Wertheimer's Seminars Revisited: Problem Solving And Thinking, Vols. I, II and III, S.U.N.Y., Albany.
- 1991-1993 (with E.H. Luchins): Max Wertheimer's Life and Background: Source Materials, Volumes I and II. Rensselaer Polytechnic Institute, Troy, NY.

Articles

- A.S. Luchins & E.H. Luchins (1979): Introduction to the Einstein-Wertheimer Correspondence, Methodology and Science, Special Einstein Issue, 12, 165–202.
- A.S. Luchins & E.H. Luchins (1982): An Introduction to the Origins of Wertheimer's Gestalt Psychology, Gestalt Theory, 4(3–4), 145–171.
- A.S. Luchins & E.H. Luchins (1985): Max Wertheimer: His life and work during 1912–1919. Gestalt Theory, 7, 3-28.
- A.S. Luchins & E.H. Luchins (1986a): Max Wertheimer: 1919–1929. Gestalt Theory, 8, 4-30.
- A.S. Luchins & E.H. Luchins (1986b): Wertheimer in Frankfurt: 1929–1933. Gestalt Theory, 8, 205–224.
- A.S. Luchins & E.H. Luchins (1987): Max Wertheimer in America: 1933–1943. Gestalt Theory, 9, 70–101.
- A.S. Luchins & E.H. Luchins (1988): The Einstein-Wertheimer Correspondence on Geometric Proofs, The Mathematical Intelligencer, 12(2), pp. 35–43.

About ASL

- Obituary by Gerhard Stemberger: Abraham S. Luchins (1914–2005). The American Psychologist, 62(2), 143.
