= Functional fixedness =

Inability to use an object other than how it is traditionally used

Functional fixedness is a cognitive bias that limits a person to use an object only in the way it is traditionally used. The concept of functional fixedness originated in Gestalt psychology, a movement in psychology that emphasizes holistic processing. Karl Duncker defined functional fixedness as being a mental block against using an object in a new way that is required to solve a problem. This "block" limits the ability of an individual to use components given to them to complete a task, as they cannot move past the original purpose of those components. For example, if someone needs a paperweight, but they only have a hammer, they may not see how the hammer can be used as a paperweight. Functional fixedness is this inability to see a hammer's use as anything other than for pounding nails; the person fails to think to use the hammer in a way other than in its conventional function.

When tested, five-year-old children show no signs of functional fixedness. It has been argued that this is because at age five, any goal to be achieved with an object is equivalent to any other goal. However, by age seven, children have acquired the tendency to treat the originally intended purpose of an object as special.

== Examples in research ==
Experimental paradigms typically involve solving problems in novel situations in which the subject has the use of a familiar object in an unfamiliar context. The object may be familiar from the subject's past experience or from previous tasks within an experiment.

=== Candle box ===
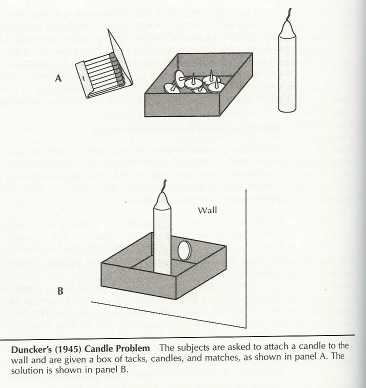
Candle box problem diagram

In a classic experiment demonstrating functional fixedness, Duncker (1945) gave participants a candle, a box of thumbtacks, and a box of matches, and asked them to attach the candle to the wall so that it did not drip onto the table below. Duncker found that participants tried to attach the candle directly to the wall with the tacks, or to glue it to the wall by melting it. Very few of them thought of using the inside of the box as a candle-holder and tacking this to the wall. In Duncker's terms, the participants were "fixated" on the box's normal function of holding thumbtacks and could not re-conceptualize it in a manner that allowed them to solve the problem. For instance, participants presented with an empty tack box were two times more likely to solve the problem than those presented with the tack box used as a container.

More recently, Frank and Ramscar (2003) gave a written version of the candle problem to undergraduates at Stanford University. When the problem was given with identical instructions to those in the original experiment, only 23% of the students were able to solve the problem. For another group of students, the noun phrases such as "box of matches" were underlined, and for a third group, the nouns (e.g., "box") were underlined. For these two groups, 55% and 47% were able to solve the problem effectively. In a follow-up experiment, all the nouns except "box" were underlined and similar results were produced. The authors concluded that students' performance was contingent on their representation of the lexical concept "box" rather than instructional manipulations. The ability to overcome functional fixedness was contingent on having a flexible representation of the word box which allows students to see that the box can be used when attaching a candle to a wall.

When Adamson (1952) replicated Duncker's box experiment, Adamson split participants into two experimental groups: preutilization and no preutilization. In this experiment, when there is preutilization, meaning when objects are presented to participants in a traditional manner (materials are in the box, thus using the box as a container), participants are less likely to consider the box for any other use, whereas with no preutilization (when boxes are presented empty), participants are more likely to think of other uses for the box.

=== The two-cord problem ===
Birch and Rabinowitz (1951) adapted the two-cord problem from experiments by Norman Maier (1930, 1931), where a participant would be shown two cords hanging from the ceiling and instructed to connect them, but the cords are far enough apart so that the participant cannot reach one while holding the other. The only solution was to tie a heavy object to one cord as a weight, making it possible to swing the cord as a pendulum, then catch the swinging cord while holding the stationary cord, and tie them together. The only heavy objects provided were an electrical switch and an electrical relay. Participants were questioned on their choice between the two objects after successfully solving the problem. The participants were split into three groups: Group R was given a pretest task to complete an electrical circuit using a relay, Group S completed an identical circuit using a switch, and Group C was the control group made up of engineering students and was given no pretraining. Participants from Group C used both objects equally as the pendulum weight, while Group R exclusively used the switch as the pendulum weight, and most from Group S used the relay. When questioned on their choice, participants argued that whichever object they had used was obviously better suited for solving the problem. Their previous experience emphasised the other object as an electrical object, and functional fixedness prevented them from seeing it as being used for another purpose.

=== Barometer question ===
The barometer question is an example of an incorrectly designed examination question demonstrating functional fixedness that causes a moral dilemma for the examiner. In its classic form, popularized by American test designer professor Alexander Calandra (1911–2006), the question asked the student to "show how it is possible to determine the height of a tall building with the aid of a barometer?" The examiner was confident that there was one, and only one, correct answer. Contrary to the examiner's expectations, the student responded with a series of completely different answers. These answers were also correct, yet none of them proved the student's competence in the specific academic field being tested.

Calandra presented the incident as a real-life, first-person experience that occurred during the Sputnik crisis. Calandra's essay, "Angels on a Pin", was published in 1959 in Pride, a magazine of the American College Public Relations Association. It was reprinted in Current Science in 1964, reprinted again in Saturday Review in 1968, and included in the 1969 edition of Calandra's The Teaching of Elementary Science and Mathematics. In the same year (1969), Calandra's essay became a subject of an academic discussion. The essay has been referenced frequently since, making its way into books on subjects ranging from teaching, writing skills, workplace counseling, and investment in real estate to chemical industry, computer programming, and integrated circuit design.

== Current conceptual relevance ==
=== Universality ===
Researchers have investigated whether functional fixedness is affected by culture.

In a recent study, preliminary evidence supporting the universality of functional fixedness was found. The study's purpose was to test if individuals from non-industrialized societies, specifically with low exposure to "high-tech" artifacts, demonstrated functional fixedness. The study tested the Shuar, hunter-horticulturalists of the Amazon region of Ecuador, and compared them to a control group from an industrial culture.

The Shuar community had only been exposed to a limited amount of industrialized artifacts, such as machete, axes, cooking pots, nails, shotguns, and fishhooks, all considered "low-tech". Two tasks were assessed to participants for the study: the box task, where participants had to build a tower to help a character from a fictional storyline to reach another character with a limited set of varied materials; the spoon task, where participants were also given a problem to solve based on a fictional story of a rabbit that had to cross a river (materials were used to represent settings) and they were given varied materials including a spoon. In the box-task, participants were slower to select the materials than participants in control conditions, but no difference in time to solve the problem was seen. In the spoon task, participants were slower in selection and completion of task. Results showed that Individuals from non-industrial ("technologically sparse cultures") were susceptible to functional fixedness. They were faster to use artifacts without priming than when design function was explained to them. This occurred even though participants were less exposed to industrialized manufactured artifacts, and that the few artifacts they currently use were used in multiple ways regardless of their design.

=== Further studies ===
Investigators examined in two experiments "whether the inclusion of examples with inappropriate elements, in addition to the instructions for a design problem, would produce fixation effects in students naive to design tasks". They examined the inclusion of examples of inappropriate elements, by explicitly depicting problematic aspects of the problem presented to the students through example designs. They tested non-expert participants on three problem conditions: with standard instruction, fixated (with inclusion of problematic design), and defixated (inclusion of problematic design accompanied with helpful methods). They were able to support their hypothesis by finding that a) problematic design examples produce significant fixation effects, and b) fixation effects can be diminished with the use of defixating instructions.

In "The Disposable Spill-Proof Coffee Cup Problem", adapted from Janson & Smith, 1991, participants were asked to construct as many designs as possible for an inexpensive, disposable, spill-proof coffee cup. Standard condition participants were presented only with instructions. In the fixated condition, participants were presented with instructions, a design, and problems they should be aware of. Finally, in the defixated condition, participants were presented the same as other conditions in addition to suggestions of design elements they should avoid using. The other two problems included building a bike rack, and designing a container for cream cheese.

== Techniques to avoid functional fixedness ==
=== In science classrooms with analogical transfer ===
Based on the assumption that students are functionally fixed, a study on analogical transfer in the science classroom shed light on significant data that could provide an overcoming technique for functional fixedness. The findings support the fact that students show positive transfer (performance) on problem solving after being presented with analogies of certain structure and format. The present study expanded Duncker's experiments from 1945 by trying to demonstrate that when students were "presented with a single analogy formatted as a problem, rather than as a story narrative, they would orient the task of problem-solving and facilitate positive transfer".

A total of 266 freshmen students from a high school science class participated in the study. The experiment was a 2x2 design where conditions: "task contexts" (type and format) vs. "prior knowledge" (specific vs. general) were attested. Students were classified into five different groups, where four were according to their prior science knowledge (ranging from specific to general), and one served as a control group (no analog presentation). The four different groups were then classified into "analog type and analog format" conditions, structural or surface types and problem or surface formats.

Inconclusive evidence was found for positive analogical transfer based on prior knowledge; however, groups did demonstrate variability. The problem format and the structural type of analog presentation showed the highest positive transference to problem solving. The researcher suggested that a well-thought and planned analogy relevant in format and type to the problem-solving task to be completed can be helpful for students to overcome functional fixedness. This study not only brought new knowledge about the human mind at work but also provides important tools for educational purposes and possible changes that teachers can apply as aids to lesson plans.

=== Uncommitting ===
One study suggests that functional fixedness can be combated by design decisions from functionally fixed designs so that the essence of the design is kept (Latour, 1994). This helps the subjects who have created functionally fixed designs understand how to go about solving general problems of this type, rather than using the fixed solution for a specific problem. Latour performed an experiment researching this by having software engineers analyze a fairly standard bit of code—the quicksort algorithm—and use it to create a partitioning function. Part of the quicksort algorithm involves partitioning a list into subsets so that it can be sorted; the experimenters wanted to use the code from within the algorithm to just do the partitioning. To do this, they abstracted each block of code in the function, discerning the purpose of it, and deciding if it is needed for the partitioning algorithm. This abstracting allowed them to reuse the code from the quicksort algorithm to create a working partition algorithm without having to design it from scratch.

=== Overcoming prototypes ===
A comprehensive study exploring several classical functional fixedness experiments showed an overlying theme of overcoming prototypes. Those that were successful at completing the tasks had the ability to look beyond the prototype, or the original intention for the item in use. Conversely, those that could not create a successful finished product could not move beyond the original use of the item. This seemed to be the case for functional fixedness categorization studies as well. Reorganization into categories of seemingly unrelated items was easier for those that could look beyond intended function. Therefore, there is a need to overcome the prototype in order to avoid functional fixedness. Carnevale (1998) suggests analyzing the object and mentally breaking it down into its components. After that is completed, it is essential to explore the possible functions of those parts. In doing so, an individual may familiarize themselves with new ways to use the items that are available to them at the givens. Individuals are therefore thinking creatively and overcoming the prototypes that limit their ability to successfully complete the functional fixedness problem.

=== Generic parts technique ===
For each object, you need to decouple its function from its form. McCaffrey (2012) shows a highly effective technique for doing so. As you break an object into its parts, ask yourself two questions. "Can I subdivide the current part further?" If yes, do so. "Does my current description imply a use?" If yes, create a more generic description involving its shape and material. For example, initially I divide a candle into its parts: wick and wax. The word "wick" implies a use: burning to emit light. So, describe it more generically as a string. Since "string" implies a use, I describe it more generically: interwoven fibrous strands. This brings to mind that I could use the wick to make a wig for my hamster. Since "interwoven fibrous strands" does not imply a use, I can stop working on wick and start working on wax. People trained in this technique solved 67% more problems that suffered from functional fixedness than a control group. This technique systematically strips away all the layers of associated uses from an object and its parts.
