= Mednick =

Mednick is a surname. Notable people with the surname include:

- Adam Mednick (born 1966), Swedish golfer
- Martha Mednick (1929–2020), American psychologist
- Murray Mednick (1939–2025), American playwright and poet
- Sara Mednick, American sleep researcher
- Sarnoff A. Mednick (1928–2015), American psychologist

== See also ==
- MEDNIK syndrome
