= Eureka effect =

Suddenly understanding a problem or concept

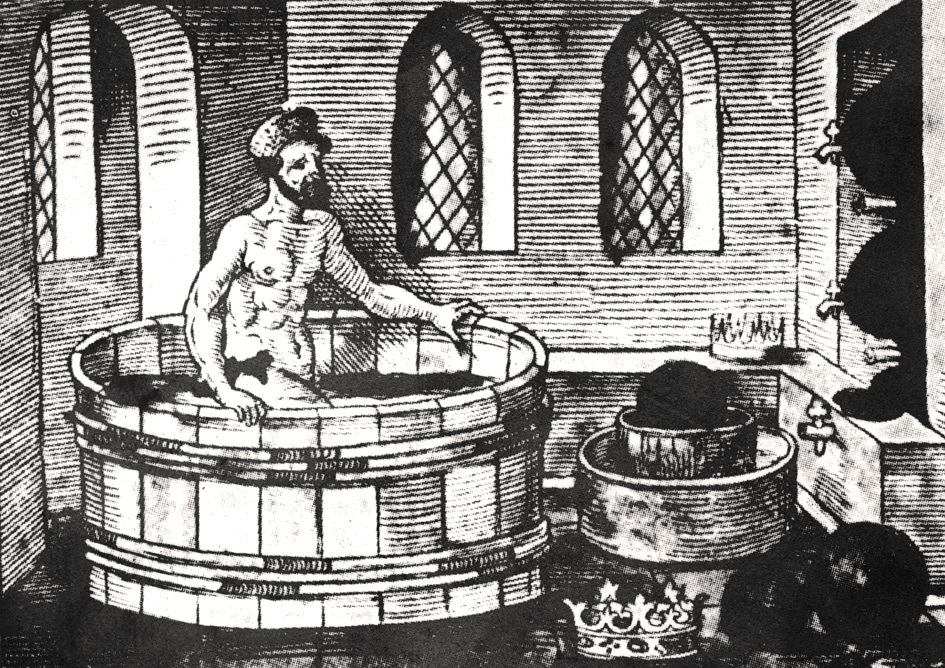
A 16th-century woodcut of Archimedes' eureka moment

The eureka effect (also known as the Aha! moment or eureka moment) refers to the common human experience of suddenly understanding a previously incomprehensible problem or concept. Some research describes the Aha! effect (also known as insight or epiphany) as a memory advantage, but conflicting results exist as to where exactly it occurs in the brain, and it is difficult to predict under what circumstances one can predict an Aha! moment.

Insight is a psychological term that attempts to describe the process in problem solving when a previously unsolvable puzzle becomes suddenly clear and obvious. Often this transition from not understanding to spontaneous comprehension is accompanied by an exclamation of joy or satisfaction, an Aha! moment. A person utilizing insight to solve a problem is able to give accurate, discrete, all-or-nothing type responses, whereas individuals not using the insight process are more likely to produce partial, incomplete responses.

A recent theoretical account of the Aha! moment started with four defining attributes of this experience. First, the Aha! moment appears suddenly; second, the solution to a problem can be processed smoothly, or fluently; third, the Aha! moment elicits positive effect; fourth, a person experiencing the Aha! moment is convinced that a solution is true. These four attributes are not separate but can be combined because the experience of processing fluency, especially when it occurs surprisingly (for example, because it is sudden), elicits both positive affect and judged truth.

Insight can be conceptualized as a two phase process. The first phase of an Aha! experience requires the problem solver to come upon an impasse, where they become stuck and even though they may seemingly have explored all the possibilities, are still unable to retrieve or generate a solution. The second phase occurs suddenly and unexpectedly. After a break in mental fixation or re-evaluating the problem, the answer is retrieved. Some research suggest that insight problems are difficult to solve because of our mental fixation on the inappropriate aspects of the problem content. In order to solve insight problems, one must "think outside the box". It is this elaborate rehearsal that may cause people to have better memory for Aha! moments. Insight is believed to occur with a break in mental fixation, allowing the solution to appear transparent and obvious.

== History and etymology ==
The effect is named from a story about ancient Greek polymath Archimedes. In the story, Archimedes was asked (c. 250 BC) by the local king to determine whether a crown was pure gold. During a subsequent trip to a public bath, Archimedes noted that water was displaced when his body sank into the bath, and particularly that the volume of water displaced equaled the volume of his body immersed in the water. Having discovered how to measure the volume of an irregular object, and conceiving of a method to solve the king's problem, Archimedes allegedly leaped out and ran home naked, shouting εὕρηκα (eureka, "I have found it!"). This story is now thought to be fictional, because it was first mentioned by the Roman writer Vitruvius nearly 200 years after the date of the alleged event, and because the method described by Vitruvius would not have worked. However, Archimedes certainly did important, original work in hydrostatics, notably in his On Floating Bodies.

== Research ==
=== Initial research ===
Research on the Aha! moment dates back more than 100 years, to the Gestalt psychologists' first experiments on chimpanzee cognition. In his 1921 book, Wolfgang Köhler described the first instance of insightful thinking in animals: One of his chimpanzees, Sultan, was presented with the task of reaching a banana that had been strung up high on the ceiling so that it was impossible to reach by jumping. After several failed attempts to reach the banana, Sultan sulked in the corner for a while, then suddenly jumped up and stacked a few boxes upon each other, climbed them and thus was able to grab the banana. This observation was interpreted as insightful thinking. Köhler's work was continued by Karl Duncker and Max Wertheimer.

The Eureka effect was later also described by Pamela Auble, Jeffrey Franks and Salvatore Soraci in 1979. The subject would be presented with an initially confusing sentence such as "The haystack was important because the cloth ripped". After a certain period of time of non-comprehension by the reader, the cue word (parachute) would be presented, the reader could comprehend the sentence, and this resulted in better recall on memory tests. Subjects spend a considerable amount of time attempting to solve the problem, and initially it was hypothesized that elaboration towards comprehension may play a role in increased recall. There was no evidence that elaboration had any effect for recall. It was found that both "easy" and "hard" sentences that resulted in an Aha! effect had significantly better recall rates than sentences that subjects were able to comprehend immediately. In fact equal recall rates were obtained for both "easy" and "hard" sentences which were initially noncomprehensible. It seems to be this noncomprehension to comprehension which results in better recall. The essence of the aha feeling underlining insight problem solving was systemically investigated by Danek et al. and Shen and his colleagues. Recently an attempt has been made in trying to understand the neurobiological basis of Eureka moment.

=== How people solve insight problems ===
Currently there are two theories for how people arrive at the solution for insight problems. The first is the progress monitoring theory. The person will analyze the distance from their current state to the goal state. Once a person realizes that they cannot solve the problem while on their current path, they will seek alternative solutions. In insight problems this usually occurs late in the puzzle. The second way that people attempt to solve these puzzles is the representational change theory. The problem solver initially has a low probability for success because they use inappropriate knowledge as they set unnecessary constraints on the problem. Once the person relaxes his or her constraints, they can bring previously unavailable knowledge into working memory to solve the problem. The person also utilizes chunk decomposition, where he or she will separate meaningful chunks into their component pieces. Both constraint relaxation and chunk decomposition allow for a change in representation, that is, a change in the distribution of activation across working memory, at which point they may exclaim, "Aha!" Currently both theories have support, with the progress monitoring theory being more suited to multiple step problems, and the representational change theory more suited to single step problems.

The Eureka effect on memory occurs only when there is an initial confusion. When subjects were presented with a clue word before the confusing sentence was presented, there was no effect on recall. If the clue was provided after the sentence was presented, an increase in recall occurred.

=== Memory ===
It had been determined that recall is greater for items that were generated by the subject versus if the subject was presented with the stimuli. There seems to be a memory advantage for instances where people are able to produce an answer themselves, recall was higher when Aha! reactions occurred. They tested sentences that were initially hard to understand, but when presented with a cued word, the comprehension became more apparent. Other evidence was found indicating that effort in processing visual stimuli was recalled more frequently than the stimuli that were simply presented. This study was done using connect-the-dots or verbal instruction to produce either a nonsense or real image. It is believed that effort made to comprehend something when encoding induces activation of alternative cues that later participate in recall.

=== Cerebral lateralization ===
Functional magnetic resonance imaging and electroencephalogram studies have found that problem solving requiring insight involves increased activity in the right cerebral hemisphere as compared with problem solving not requiring insight. In particular, increased activity was found in the right hemisphere anterior superior temporal gyrus.

=== Sleep ===
Some unconscious processing may take place while a person is asleep, and there are several cases of scientific discoveries coming to people in their dreams. Friedrich August Kekulé von Stradonitz claimed that the ring structure of benzene came to him in a dream where a snake was eating its own tail. Studies have shown increased performance at insight problems if the subjects slept during a break between receiving the problem and solving it. Sleep may function to restructure problems, and allow new insights to be reached. Henri Poincaré stated that he valued sleep as a time for "unconscious thought" that helped him break through problems.

=== Other theories ===
Professor Stellan Ohlsson believes that at the beginning of the problem-solving process, some salient features of the problem are incorporated into a mental representation of the problem. In the first step of solving the problem, it is considered in the light of previous experience. Eventually, an impasse is reached, where all approaches to the problem have failed, and the person becomes frustrated. Ohlsson believes that this impasse drives unconscious processes which change the mental representation of a problem, and cause novel solutions to occur.

=== General procedure for conducting ERP and EEG studies ===
When studying insight, or the Aha! effect, ERP or EEG general methods are used. Initially a baseline measurement is taken, which generally asks the subject to simply remember an answer to a question. Following this, subjects are asked to focus on the screen while a logogriph is shown, and then they are given time with a blank screen to get the answer, once they do they are required to press a key. After which the answer appears on the screen. The subjects are then asked to press one key to indicate that they thought of the correct answer and another to indicate if they got the answer wrong, finally, not to press a key at all if they were unsure or did not know the answer.

=== Evidence in EEG studies ===
Resting-state neural activity has a standing influence on cognitive strategies used when solving problems, particularly in the case of deriving solutions by methodical search or by sudden insight. The two cognitive strategies used involve both search and analysis of current state of a problem, to the goal state of that problem, while insight problems are a sudden awareness of the solution to a problem.

Subjects studied were first recorded on the base-line resting state of thinking. After being tested using the method described in the previous section, the ratio of insight versus non-insight solution were made to determine whether an individual is classified as a high insight (HI) or a low insight (LI) individual. Discriminating between HI and LI individuals were important as both groups use different cognitive strategies to solve anagram problems used in this study. Right hemisphere activation is believed to be involved in Aha! effects, so it comes as no surprise that HI individuals would show greater activation in the right hemisphere than the left hemisphere when compared to the LI individuals. Evidence was found to support this idea, there was greater activation in HI subjects at the right dorsal-frontal (low-alpha band), right inferior-frontal (beta and gamma bands) and the right parietal (gamma band) areas. As for LI subjects, left inferior-frontal and left anterior-temporal areas were active (low-alpha band).

There were also differences in attention between individuals of HI and LI. It has been suggested that individuals who are highly creative exhibit diffuse attention, thus allowing them a greater range of environmental stimuli. It was found that individuals who displayed HI would have less resting state occipital alpha-band activity, meaning there would be less inhibition of the visual system. Individuals that were less creative were found to focus their attention, thus causing them to sample less of their environment. Although, LI individuals were shown to have more occipital beta activity, consistent with heightened focused attention.

=== Evidence in ERP studies ===
Source localization is hard in ERP studies, and it may be difficult to distinguish signals of insight from signals of the existing cognitive skills it builds on or the unwarranted mental fixation it breaks, but the following conclusions have been offered.

One study found that "Aha" answers produced more negative ERP results, N380 in the ACC, than the "No-Aha" answers, 250–500 ms, after an answer was produced. The authors suspected that this N380 in the ACC is a sign of breaking the mental set, and reflects the Aha! effect. Another study was done showed that an Aha! effect elicited an N320 in the central-posterior region. A third study, by Qiu and Zhang (2008), found that there was a N350 in the posterior cingulate cortex for successful guessing, not in the anterior cingulate cortex. The posterior cingulate cortex seems to play a more non-executive function in monitoring and inhibiting the mind set and cognitive function.

Another significant finding of this study was a late positive component (LPC) in successful guessing and then recognition of the answer at 600 and 700 ms, post-stimulus, in the parahippocampal gyrus (BA34). The data suggests that the parahippocampus is involved in searching for a correct answer by manipulating it in working memory, and integrating relationships. The parahippocampal gyrus may reflect the formation of novel associations while solving insight problems.

A fourth ERP study is fairly similar, but this study claims to have anterior cingulate cortex activation at N380, which may be responsible for the mediation of breaking the mental set. Other areas of interest were prefrontal cortex (PFC), the posterior parietal cortex, and the medial temporal lobe. If subjects failed to solve the riddle, and then were shown the correct answer, they displayed the feeling of insight, which was reflected on the electroencephalogram recordings.

=== Evidence in fMRI studies ===
A study with the goal of recording the activity that occurs in the brain during an Aha! moment using fMRIs was conducted in 2003 by Jing Luo and Kazuhisa Niki. Participants in this study were presented with a series of Japanese riddles, and asked to rate their impressions toward each question using the following scale: (1) I can understand this question very well and know the answer; (2) I can understand this question very well and feel it is interesting, but I do not know the answer; or (3) I cannot understand this question and do not know the answer. This scale allowed the researchers to only look at participants who would experience an Aha! moment upon viewing the answer to the riddle. In previous studies on insight, researchers have found that participants reported feelings of insight when they viewed the answer to an unsolved riddle or problem. Luo and Niki had the goal of recording these feelings of insight in their participants using fMRIs. This method allowed the researchers to directly observe the activity that was occurring in the participant's brains during an Aha! moment.

An example of a Japanese riddle used in the study: The thing that can move heavy logs, but cannot move a small nail → A river.

Participants were given 3 minutes to respond to each riddle, before the answer to the riddle was revealed. If the participant experienced an Aha! moment upon viewing the correct answer, any brain activity would be recorded on the fMRI. The fMRI results for this study showed that when participants were given the answer to an unsolved riddle, the activity in their right hippocampus increased significantly during these Aha! moments. This increased activity in the right hippocampus may be attributed to the formation of new associations between old nodes. These new associations will in turn strengthen memory for the riddles and their solutions.

Although various studies using EEGs, ERPs, and fMRI's report activation in a variety of areas in the brain during Aha! moments, this activity occurs predominantly in the right hemisphere. More details on the neural basis of insight see a recent review named "New advances in the neural correlates of insight: A decade in review of the insightful brain"

== Insight problems and problems with insight ==
=== Insight problems ===
==== The Nine Dot Problem ====
The "nine dots" puzzle (left) has the goal of linking all 9 dots using four straight lines or less, without lifting the pen. Its solution (right) is to draw those lines "outside the box". Most individuals fail to draw lines beyond the dots that compose the square, and are unable to solve the puzzle.

The Nine Dot Problem is a classic spatial problem used by psychologists to study insight. The problem consists of a 3 × 3 square created by 9 black dots. The task is to connect all 9 dots using exactly 4 straight lines, without retracing or removing one's pen from the paper. Kershaw & Ohlsson report that in a laboratory setting with a time limit of 2 or 3 minutes, the expected solution rate is 0%.

The difficulty with the Nine Dot Problem is that it requires respondents to look beyond the conventional figure-ground relationships that create subtle, illusory spatial constraints and (literally) "think outside of the box". Breaking the spatial constraints shows a shift in attention in working memory and utilizing new knowledge factors to solve the puzzle.

==== Verbal riddles ====
Verbal riddles are becoming popular problems in insight research. For example:

Question: A man was washing windows on a high-rise building when he fell from the 40-foot ladder to the concrete path below. Amazingly, he was unhurt. Why?
Answer: He slipped from the bottom rung.

==== Matchstick arithmetic ====
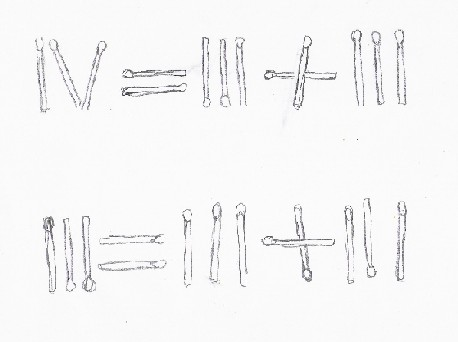
Two examples of matchstick arithmetic problems

A subset of matchstick puzzles, matchstick arithmetic, which was developed and used by G. Knoblich, involves matchsticks that are arranged to show a simple but incorrect math equation in Roman numerals. The task is to correct the equation by moving only one matchstick.

==== Anagrams ====
Anagrams involve manipulating the order of a given set of letters in order to create one or many words. The original set of letters may be a word itself, or simply a jumble.

Example: Santa can be transformed to spell Satan.

==== Rebus puzzles ====
Rebus puzzles, also called "wordies", involve verbal and visual cues that force the respondent to restructure and "read between the lines" (almost literally) to solve the puzzle.

Some examples:

1. Puzzle: you just me [Answer: just between you and me]
2. Puzzle: PUNISHMENT [Answer: capital punishment]
3. Puzzle:

   i i i 
   OOOOO

[Answer: circles under the eyes]

==== Remote Associates Test (RAT) ====
The Remote Associates Test (known as the RAT) was developed by Martha Mednick in 1962 to test creativity. However, it has recently been utilized in insight research.

The test consists of presenting participants with a set of words, such as lick, mine, and shaker. The task is to identify the word that connects these three seemingly unrelated ones. In this example, the answer is salt. The link between words is associative, and does not follow rules of logic, concept formation or problem solving, and thus requires the respondent to work outside of these common heuristical constraints.

Performance on the RAT is known to correlate with performance on other standard insight problems.

==== The Eight Coin Problem ====
In this problem a set of 8 coins is arranged on a table in a certain configuration, and the subject is told to move 2 coins so that all coins touch exactly three others. The difficulty in this problem comes from thinking of the problem in a purely 2-dimensional way, when a 3-dimensional approach is the only way to solve the problem.

==== Problems with insight ====
Insight research is problematic because of the ambiguity and lack of agreement among psychologists of its definition. This could largely be explained by the phenomenological nature of insight, and the difficulty in catalyzing its occurrence, as well as the ways in which it is experimentally "triggered".

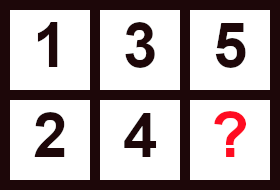
Example of a puzzle that requires an insight from the solver. Asked what goes in the blank square, and told that it is not the number six, the solver must realise that the image represents a gear stick and the answer is "R" for "Reverse".

The pool of insight problems currently employed by psychologists is small and tepid, and due to its heterogeneity and often high difficulty level, is not conducive of validity or reliability.

One of the biggest issues surrounding insight problems is that for most participants, they are simply too difficult. For many problems, this difficulty revolves around the requisite restructuring or re-conceptualization of the problem or possible solutions, for example, drawing lines beyond the square composed of dots in the Nine-Dot Problem.

Furthermore, there are issues related to the taxonomy of insight problems. Puzzles and problems that are utilized in experiments to elicit insight may be classified in two ways. "Pure" insight problems are those that necessitate the use of insight, whereas "hybrid" insight problems are those that can be solved by other methods, such as the trial and error. As Weisberg (1996) points out, the existence of hybrid problems in insight research poses a significant threat to any evidence gleaned from studies that employ them. While the phenomenological experience of insight can help to differentiate insight-solving from non-insight solving (by asking the respondent to describe how they solved the problem, for example), the risk that non-insight solving has been mistaken for insight solving still exists. Likewise, issues surrounding the validity of insight evidence is also threatened by the characteristically small sample sizes. Experimenters may recruit an initially adequate sample size, but because of the level of difficulty inherent to insight problems, only a small fraction of any sample will successfully solve the puzzle or task given to them; placing serious limits on usable data. In the case of studies using hybrid problems, the final sample is at even greater risk of being very small by way of having to exclude whatever percentage of respondents solved their given puzzle without utilizing insight.

== The Aha! effect and scientific discovery ==
There are several examples of scientific discoveries being made after a sudden flash of insight. One of the key insights in developing his special theory of relativity came to Albert Einstein while talking to his friend Michele Besso:

I started the conversation with him in the following way: "Recently I have been working on a difficult problem. Today I come here to battle against that problem with you." We discussed every aspect of this problem. Then suddenly I understood where the key to this problem lay. Next day I came back to him again and said to him, without even saying hello, "Thank you. I've completely solved the problem."

However, Einstein has said that the whole idea of special relativity did not come to him as a sudden, single eureka moment, and that he was "led to it by steps arising from the individual laws derived from experience". Similarly, Carl Friedrich Gauss said after a eureka moment: "I have the result, only I do not yet know how to get to it."

Sir Alec Jeffreys had a eureka moment in his lab in Leicester after looking at the X-ray film image of a DNA experiment at 9:05 am on Monday 10 September 1984, which unexpectedly showed both similarities and differences between the DNA of different members of his technician's family. Within about half an hour, he realized the scope of DNA profiling, which uses variations in the genetic code to identify individuals. The method has become important in forensic science to assist detective work, and in resolving paternity and immigration disputes. It can also be applied to non-human species, such as in wildlife population genetics studies. Before his methods were commercialised in 1987, Jeffreys' laboratory was the only centre carrying out DNA fingerprinting in the world.

== See also ==
- Insight phenomenology
- Apprehension (understanding)
- Rubber duck debugging
- Principles of grouping
- Katsu (Zen)
