= John Alexander McGeoch =

American psychologist and educator

- Born: October 9, 1897; Argyle, New York, United States
- Died: March 3, 1942 (aged 44); Iowa City, Iowa, United States
- Education: Colorado College; University of Chicago
- Known for: Experimental psychology in human learning
- Scientific career
- Fields: Psychology
- Workplaces: Washington University in St. Louis; University of Arkansas; University of Missouri; Wesleyan University; University of Iowa
- Doctoral advisor: Harvey A. Carr
- Doctoral students: Benton J. Underwood

John Alexander McGeoch (October 9, 1897 – March 3, 1942) was an American psychologist and educator. Considered a modern functionalist, his interests focused on human learning and memory. He was the chair of the department of psychology at the University of Missouri from 1930 to 1935, Wesleyan University from 1935 to 1939, and University of Iowa from 1939 to 1942. He was also an editor for the Psychological Bulletin from 1931 to 1942.

== Background ==
McGeoch was born on October 9, 1897, in Argyle, New York. He received his bachelor's degree from Westminster College in 1918, and a master's degree from Colorado College in 1919.

McGeoch's master's thesis, titled "The Present Status of Psychology", is a review of the history of the field of psychology and how the role of psychology was viewed in the early 20th century. He then studied under Harvey A. Carr at the University of Chicago. He studied a variety of topics while at the University of Chicago, including suggestibility and intelligence in delinquents, time perception, neuropsychological and vocational testing, and the reliability and validity of the Pressey X-O test. McGeoch's doctoral dissertation was titled "A study in the psychology of testimony". Following the completion of his dissertation, McGeoch's work primarily focused on human learning and memory. Harvey Carr significantly influenced McGeoch's work, and provided feedback on McGeoch's introductory textbook on human learning, The Psychology of Human Learning, which was published after Carr's death in 1943. McGeoch completed his PhD while he was a faculty member at the Washington University in St. Louis. He accepted a full Professor position two years later at the University of Arkansas. In 1930, McGeoch moved to the University of Missouri, where he became the chair of the department of psychology. He held this position for five years before moving to Wesleyan University, where he was also chair of the department from 1935 to 1939 and was awarded an honorary degree in recognition of his accomplishments as a lecturer and administrator. In 1939, McGeoch moved to the University of Iowa, where he also chaired the department. He died in Iowa City on March 3, 1942, from a cerebral hemorrhage.

== Psychological study ==
McGeoch was considered to be one of the "most productive and influential investigators of human learning and memory during the period between the two World Wars." He published approximately 60 articles on human learning over the course of 20 years. His more notable contributions included standardization of the methods and operationalizations used in human memory research, the distinction between incidental and intentional learning, and the distinction between immediate and long-term memory, and his interpretation of forgetting.

=== Early work ===
McGeoch's publication titled "The Vertical Dimensions of Mind" emphasizes the importance of longitudinal data and operational definition. Prior to the publication of this article, most studies were cross-sectional in design. In this paper, McGeoch defends the importance of considering longitudinal data in research. He notes that learning is a pervasive construct which influences the understanding of all psychological phenomena. He is also one of the first researchers to describe different types of learning: incidental and intentional, and different types of memory: short- and long-term.

=== Later work ===
In his publication titled "Forgetting and the law of disuse", McGeoch criticizes Thorndike's theory of the Law of Disuse, which posits that information is forgotten over time if it is not activated. McGeoch argues that the passage of time has no bearing on forgetting; rather, forgetting can be better understood in terms of interference that takes place during the interval between initial learning and test. Following the introduction of the concept of Retroactive inhibition, McGeoch developed the transfer theory of retroactive inhibition. This theory identifies two major contributors to forgetting: retroactive inhibition and change in context between learning and recall, and influenced how forgetting is understood today. More specifically, McGeoch's work set the stage for the Two-factor Theory of Interference. McGeoch also wrote an introductory textbook on human learning, which was published posthumously.

== Summary ==
McGeoch is recognized as a pioneer in the field of human learning and memory. He changed the way researchers understand human forgetting by disproving Thorndike's law of disuse, encouraging Longitudinal study, and distinguishing incidental learning from intentional learning. He also identified retroactive inhibition as a mechanism for forgetting.

Notable publications:

- McGeoch, J. A. (1932). "Forgetting and the law of disuse". Psychological Review. 39 (4): 352–370. doi:10.1037/h0069819.
- McGeoch, J. A. (1936). "The vertical dimensions of mind". Psychological Review. 43 (2): 107–129. doi:10.1037/h0054843.
- McGeoch, J. A., & Irion, A. L. (1952). The psychology of human learning.
