= Argyle Airport (New York) =

- IATA: none; ICAO: none; FAA LID: 1C3

Summary
- Airport type: Public use
- Owner: Dick Bovey
- Serves: Argyle, New York
- Elevation AMSL: 330 ft (100 m)
- Coordinates: 43°15′16″N 073°28′13″W

Map
- Location of airport in New York

Runways
Direction	Length		Surface
Direction	ft	m	Surface
3/21	2,400	732	Turf

Statistics (2012)
- Aircraft operations: 20,000
- Based aircraft: 32
- Sources: FAA and NYSDOT

Argyle Airport (FAA LID: 1C3) is a privately owned, public use airport in Washington County, New York, United States. It is located off of NY Route 40 two nautical miles (4 km) northeast of the central business district of Argyle, a village in the Town of Argyle.

== Facilities and aircraft ==
Argyle Airport covers an area of 50 acres (20 ha) at an elevation of 330 feet (101 m) above mean sea level. It has one runway designated 3/21 with a turf surface measuring 2,400 by 87 feet (732 × 27 m).

For the 12-month period ending June 19, 2018, the airport had 20,000 aircraft operations, an average of 54 per day: 95% general aviation and 5% military. At that time there were 32 aircraft based at this airport: 88% single-engine, 9% ultralight, and 3% helicopter.

== See also ==
- List of airports in New York
