= Insight phenomenology =

Problem Solving Strategy

Insight is a sudden understanding of a problem or a strategy that aids in solving a problem. Usually, this involves conceptualizing the problem in a completely new way. Although insights may appear to be sudden, they are actually the result of prior thought and effort. While insight can be involved in solving well-structured problems, it is more often associated with ill-structured problems.

== Viewpoints ==
- The Nothing-Special View: Insight is merely an extension of ordinary perceiving, recognizing, learning, and conceiving. Insights are significant products of ordinary thinking.
- The Neo-Gestaltist View: Insight problem solvers show poor ability to predict their success. Problem-solvers do not show increase in feelings of "warmth" as they draw nearer to a solution of an insight problem. This supports the Gestaltist view that there is something special about insightful problem solving, as opposed to noninsightful, routine problem solving.
- The Three-Process View: There are three different kinds of insights. (1) Selective-encoding insights involve distinguishing relevant from irrelevant information. (2) Selective-comparison insights involve novel perceptions of how new information relates to old information. (3) Selective-combination insights involve taking selectively encoded and compared bits of relevant information and combining them in a novel way.

When people solve, or attempt to solve an insight puzzle, they experience a common phenomenology, that is, a set of behavioural properties that accompany problem-solving activity (for a useful edited review of insight problems and their phenomenology, see Sternberg & Davidson, 1995). Other kinds of puzzle, such as the Tower of Hanoi, an example of a transformation problem, tend not to yield these phenomena. The phenomena may include:

- Impasse: An individual reaches a point where he or she simply appears to run out of ideas of new things to try that might solve a problem.
- Fixation: An individual repeats the same type of solution attempt again and again, even when they see that it does not seem to lead to solution.
- Incubation: A pause or gap between attempts to solve a problem can sometimes appear to aid the finding of a solution, as if one is clearing the mind of faulty ideas.
- The 'Aha' experience: The solutions to some insight problems can seem to appear from nowhere, like a Eureka moment.

== Insight cultivators ==
Max van Mannen proposed the so-called insight cultivators to obtain thematic insights when studying a phenomenon or phenomenological topic or event. This framework holds that insights can be obtained from philosophic, humanities, and human science sources. The idea is that the works of artists, scholars, and philosophers help us gain understanding about our own lived experiences. There is the view that this process can yield phenomenological anecdotes that can trigger an understanding that is beyond or more effective than what we could grasp intellectually because of the creative insights and understanding of a phenomenon.

Insight cultivators can also lead to innovative or unique insights because they allow an evaluation of previous literature and experiences that reveal what has worked, what needs improvement, or what is wrong. The insights gleaned can allow us to identify a new way of looking at a phenomenon.

== See also ==
- Eureka effect
- Wolfgang Köhler
