= Moses Kill =

Moses Kill Moss Kill, Moses Kil
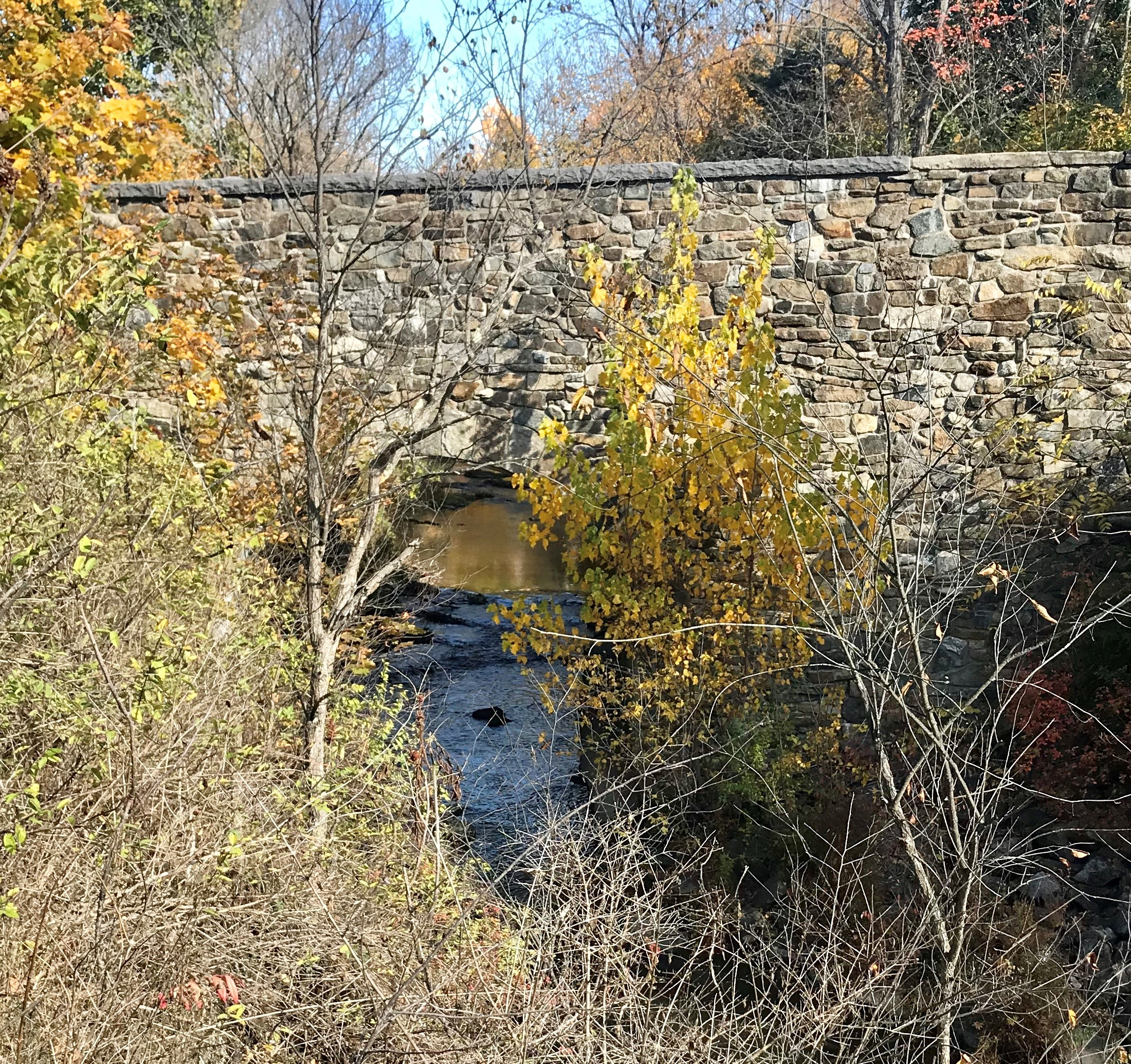
- Moses Kill passing underneath Route 197 1870 Stone Bridge in Argyle, New York

Location
- Country: United States
- State: New York
- Region: Hudson Valley
- County: Washington
- Towns: Argyle, New York,

Physical characteristics
- Source
  - location: Argyle, New York
  - coordinates: 43°17′44″N 73°24′42″W
  - elevation: 720 ft (220 m)
- Mouth: Hudson River at Fort Edward, New York
  - location: Fort Edward, New York
  - coordinates: 43°11′57″N 73°34′55″W
  - elevation: 118 ft (36 m)

Basin features
- River system: Hudson River
- Tributaries
  - left: Dead Creek
  - right: Gillis Brook

The Moses Kill is an approximately 22.0-mile-long (35.4 km) tributary stream of the Hudson River in New York state. The source is in the foothills of the Taconic Mountains in Hartford in Washington county. The stream flows thru the town and village of Argyle before entering the Hudson River at Fort Edward, just south of Griffin Island.

== History ==
Beginning in the late 1760s the Moses Kill's water was dammed at a few locations to support several small mills near Argyle Village. In July 1777, Polish military engineer Col. Thaddeus Kościuszko under the command of American Major General Major Philip Schuyler heavily entrenched and fortified an American camp along the south side of the Moses Kill, where it empties into the Hudson River in hopes of defeating or slowing British General Burgoyne’s army.

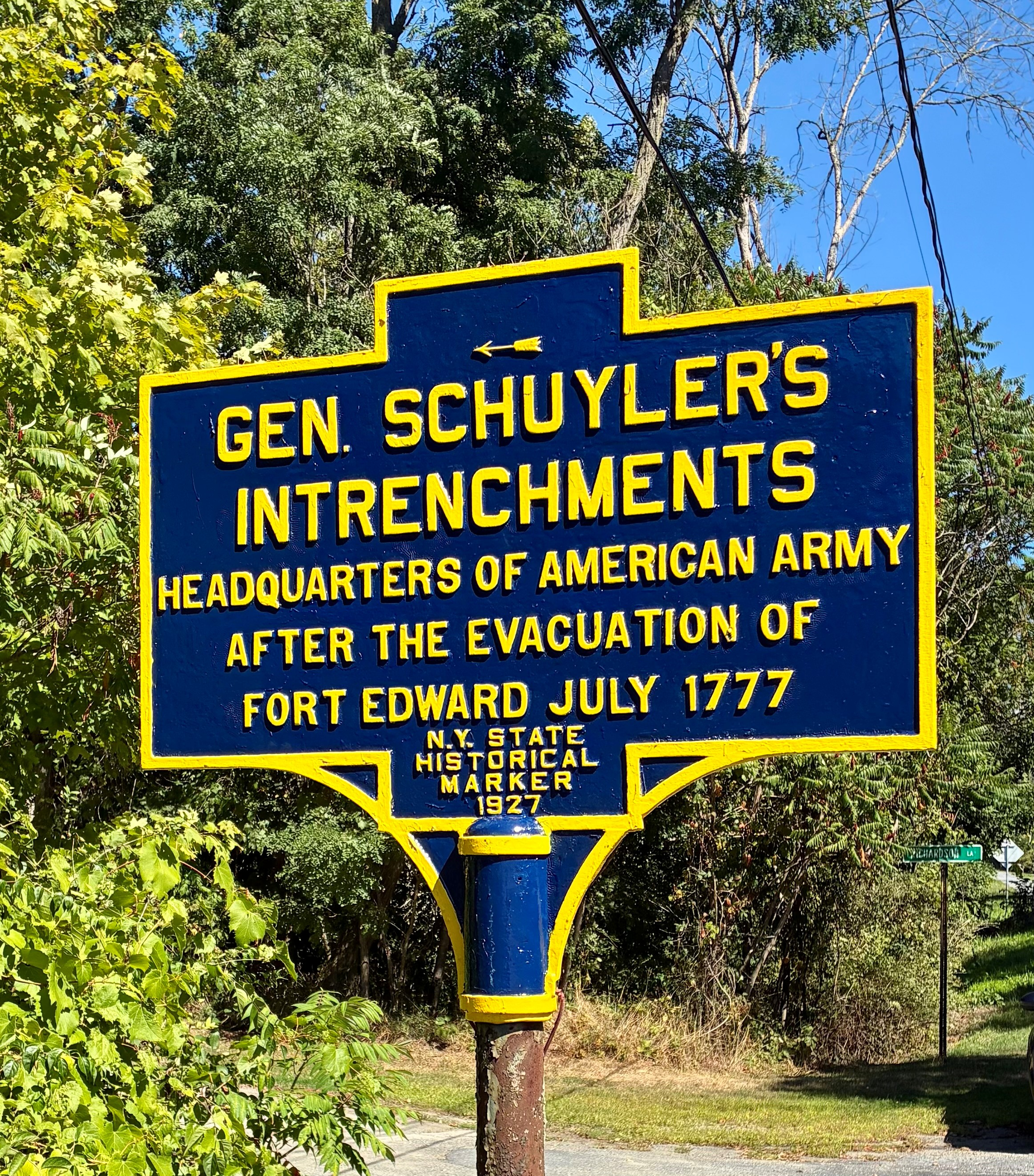
Historical marker detailing the location of Gen. Schuyler's intrenchments and HQ in July 1777.

Burgoyne’s army, advancing from Canada, was part of a British campaign attempting to divide the American colonies. On 30 July, 1777, Schuyler and his army retreated from the Moses Kill southward towards Saratoga owing to an understrength of military forces, lack of adequate supplies, and the potential of being outflanked. A New York State Historical Marker erected in 1927 at the corner of Patterson Road and US Route 4, south of the Moses Kill marks the former intrenchment’s location.

== In popular culture ==
In 2022, the American Indie Rock Band Sadurn released its debut album Radiator, which includes a song/music video titled Moses Kill. The lyrics mention a river, with a farm nearby, which empties into the Hudson River.

== See also ==
- List of rivers of New York
