= John Allen Farm massacre =

Farm at South Argyle, Washington County

Coordinates: 43.1901°N 73.4779°W

The John Allen Farm massacre occurred in South Argyle, Washington County, New York, on 25 or 26 July 1777 during the advancement of the British army in the Saratoga campaign of the American Revolutionary War. Six members of the John Allen family and two or three enslaved servants loaned to the Allens were killed by Native Americans attached to General John Burgoyne's British troops. Shortly thereafter, on 27 July, Native Americans led by the warrior Le Loup attacked and killed Jane McCrea in nearby Fort Edward, which garnered publicity in newspapers along the eastern seaboard of America and is believed to have helped rally locals to the American patriotic cause.

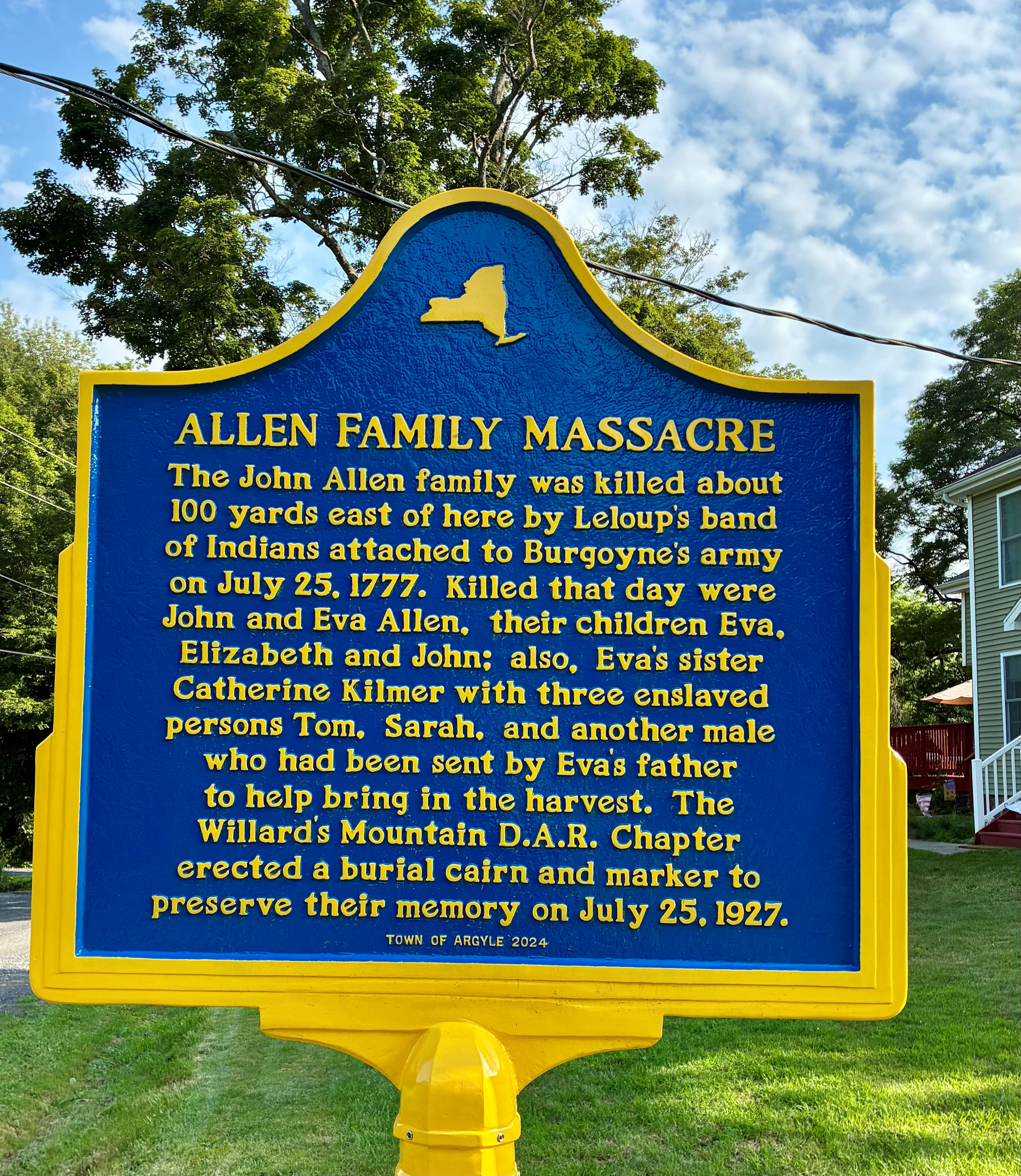
Historical marker describing the killing at the Allen Farm prior to the Battle of Saratoga in 1777

== Events ==
On the day they were killed, members of the Allen family and the enslaved servants were harvesting wheat in the fields of the Allen farm, approximately 3.3 mi (5.3 km) south of the village of Argyle. As the workers gathered for the midday meal, the Native Americans attacked the farmhouse, killing all and taking their scalps. Killed were John Allen, his wife Eva Kilmer Allen, daughters Eva and Elizabeth, baby John, Eva Kilmer Allen's younger sister Catherine Kilmer, and African American enslaved servants Tom, Sarah, and an unnamed individual.

== Memorials ==
A stone cairn, erected in 1927 near where the Allen farmhouse stood, is believed to be the final resting spot for those killed. Two nearby New York State historical markers on Allen Road, off of County Road 49, note the event, and a memorial was dedicated in July 2017 on the 240th anniversary in Prospect Hill Cemetery in Argyle. In Spring 2023, a memorial marker was placed in the nearby South Argyle Church Cemetery also commemorating the event.

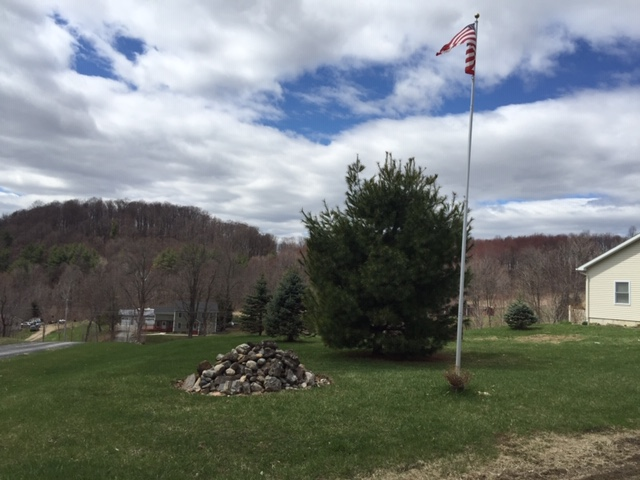
Cairn in Argyle, New York, for those killed at the John Allen Farm in July 1777 by Native Americans attached to British General Burgoyne's army on their way to the Battles of Saratoga during the American Revolutionary War.

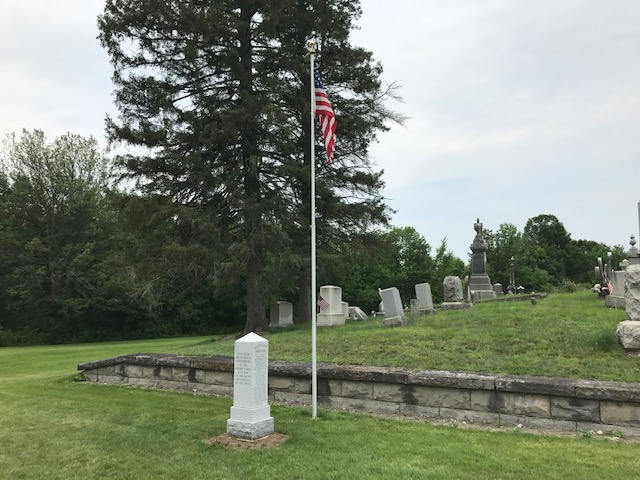
Memorial in Prospect Hill Cemetery in Argyle, New York, for those killed at the John Allen Farm in July 1777 by Native Americans attached to British General Burgoyne's army on their way to the Battles of Saratoga during the American Revolutionary War.
