= Argyle (town), New York =

Argyle
- Town
- Location in Washington County and the state of New York.
- Coordinates: 43°14′10″N 73°29′27″W
- Country: United States
- State: New York
- County: Washington

Government
  - Town supervisor: Robert Henke

Area
  - Total: 57.80 sq mi (149.69 km^{2})
  - Land: 56.54 sq mi (146.43 km^{2})
  - Water: 1.26 sq mi (3.26 km^{2})

Population (2020)
  - Total: 3,644
  - Estimate (2022): 3,648
  - Density: 65.5/sq mi (25.28/km^{2})
- Time zone: UTC-5 (Eastern (EST))
  - Summer (DST): UTC-4 (EDT)
- ZIP code(s): 12809
- Area code: 518 838
- FIPS code: 36-115-02561
- Website: townofargyleny.com

Argyle is a town in Washington County, New York, United States. It is part of the Glens Falls Metropolitan Statistical Area. The town population was 3,644 at the 2020 census. The town was named by its many early settlers from Scotland after Argyllshire.

== History ==
The lands of Argyle prior to becoming the town were used as hunting and fishing grounds for Native American Mohicans and subsequently the Mohawk tribes although Huron and Iroquois tribes may also have hunted here. During the period 1628 to 1664, the Mohawk tribe had a near exclusive fur trading monopoly with the Dutch New Netherland Colony based at nearby Fort Orange; now present day Albany. The town of Argyle was formed from the Argyll Patent of 1764 while still in Great Britain's Albany County, Province of New York and became a town in Charlotte County when that county was created on March 24, 1772.

During the American Revolution, citizens of the town had divided loyalties between the Crown and the Rebel cause. Records indicate at least 95 men with Argyle ties joined the American militia. Many settlers may have been influenced by the killings of Jane McCrae in Fort Edward and the John Allen family in South Argyle prior to the Battle of Saratoga in 1777. During the time of the 9th New York State Legislature, Argyle was officially formed as a town on March 23, 1786. Since many of the original settlers were from Argyll, Scotland, they adopted the name of their native land to the town. Although population growth was slow, the town was the most populous in the county by 1790.

In 1803, part of the town in the south-east portion near Cossayuna Lake was used to establish the new Town of Greenwich. In April 1818, an additional portion of the town in the north-west corner along the Hudson River was taken by New York State legislative act to establish the Town of Fort Edward and to add lands that would eventually become part of the Village of Fort Edward.

According to the first census of the United States in 1790, a small number of Argyle residents, along with those from other towns in New York held enslaved people prior to the final abolition of slavery in New York State on July 5, 1827. In 1790, 14 enslaved were reported in the Argyle census count, 29 in 1800, and 15 in 1810. In the early- to mid-1800s, Argyle was also home to abolitionists and the Ransom Stiles home and the County Poor House were believed to be stops on the underground railroad for southern slaves fleeing to Canada.

During the American Civil War, approximately 90 men of Argyle enlisted with the 123rd New York Volunteer Infantry Regiment Company F (Washington Country Regiment), and 37 men with the 93rd New York Infantry Regiment, according to the New York State Military Museum. Additional New York volunteer regiments which, at times, contained soldiers from Argyle according to "The History of Washington County" published in 1878, were the 22nd, 44th, 77th, and 96th Infantry Regiments and the 2nd and 7th Cavalry and 16th NY Heavy Artillery Regiments. At least nine additional men with Argyle ties enlisted with the 8th, 20th, 26th, and 31st New York/US Colored Troop Infantry Regiments and 54th Massachusetts Infantry Regiment.

Voters in Argyle overwhelmingly passed four resolutions on November 5, 2019, allowing alcohol to be sold within the Town and Village ending Argyle's "dry" status which it had maintained since a few years after the repeal of Prohibition. Previously Argyle was the largest dry town in New York State.

The U.S. National Weather Service confirmed an EF1 tornado touched down near the hamlet of Goose Island on Monday, August 10, 2020. Damage to roofs and sidings of nearby homes was limited and no injuries were reported, although many tree trunks were snapped or uprooted. According to TornadoHistoryProject.com, at least five tornadoes have been confirmed touching down in Washington County since 1950, although this is the first to be confirmed within Argyle during that time.

The Town of Argyle was near the path of totality (98.5%) during the Solar eclipse of April 8, 2024 according to the WEB site timeanddata.com.

== Geography ==
According to the United States Census Bureau, the town has a total area of 57.8 sq mi (150 km^{2}), of which 56.7 sq mi (147 km^{2}) is land and 1.1 sq mi (2.8 km^{2}) (1.92%) is water. The town mainly lies along the narrow northern ridge of the Taconic Mountains between the Hudson River and New York's border with the State of Vermont. In the western area of the town, farmland and small wooded lots are considered part of the Hudson River valley. A portion of these farmlands are also within the Washington County Grasslands, an approximately 13,000 acre area which is a winter roosting site for state endangered short-eared owls; winter and breeding ground for other threatened and declining grassland birds, including Northern Harrier, Horned Lark, Upland Sandpiper, Eastern Bluebirds and Bobolinks. Snowy Owls are also regular visitors.

In the eastern part of the town, elevations increase, with several mountains reaching over 1,000 feet in height; with the highest being a few feet over 1,120 feet in height north of the hamlet of Goose Island. Two lakes, which both have extensive seasonal camps and year-round homes, are in this portion of the town; the spring-fed Summit Lake and further to the east, the larger Cossayuna Lake. From many locations in Argyle, the Adirondack Mountains can be viewed to the north and west and the Taconic and Green Mountains of Vermont can be viewed to the east.

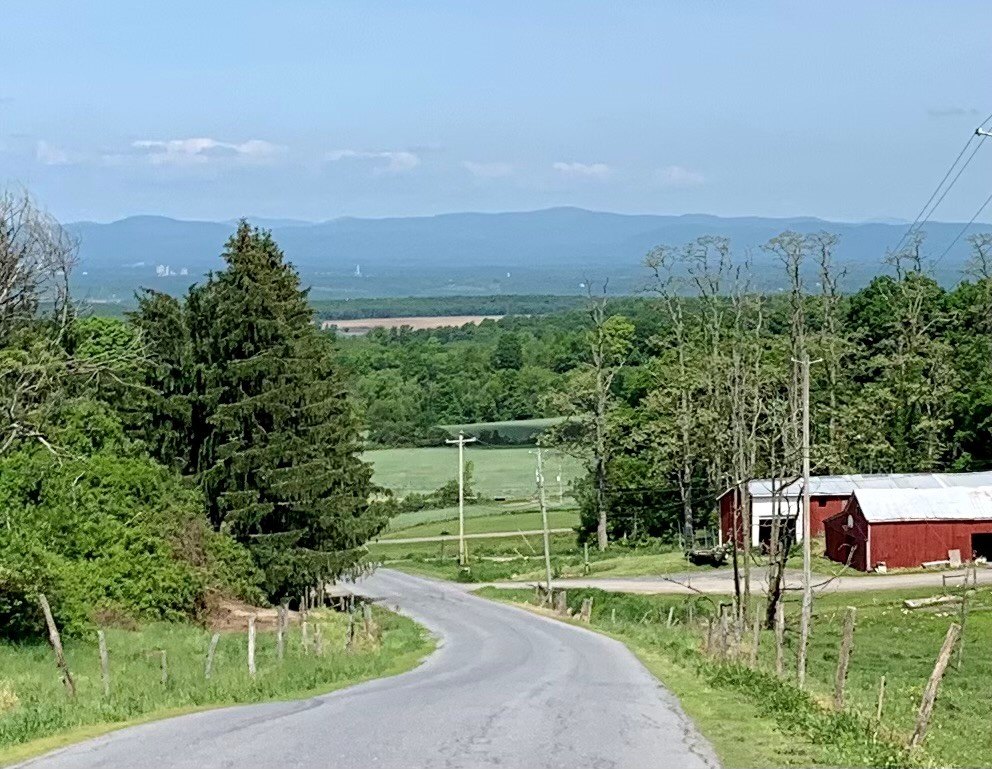
View from Argyle's Street Road looking WNW at the Hudson Valley and the nearby Adirondack Mountains.

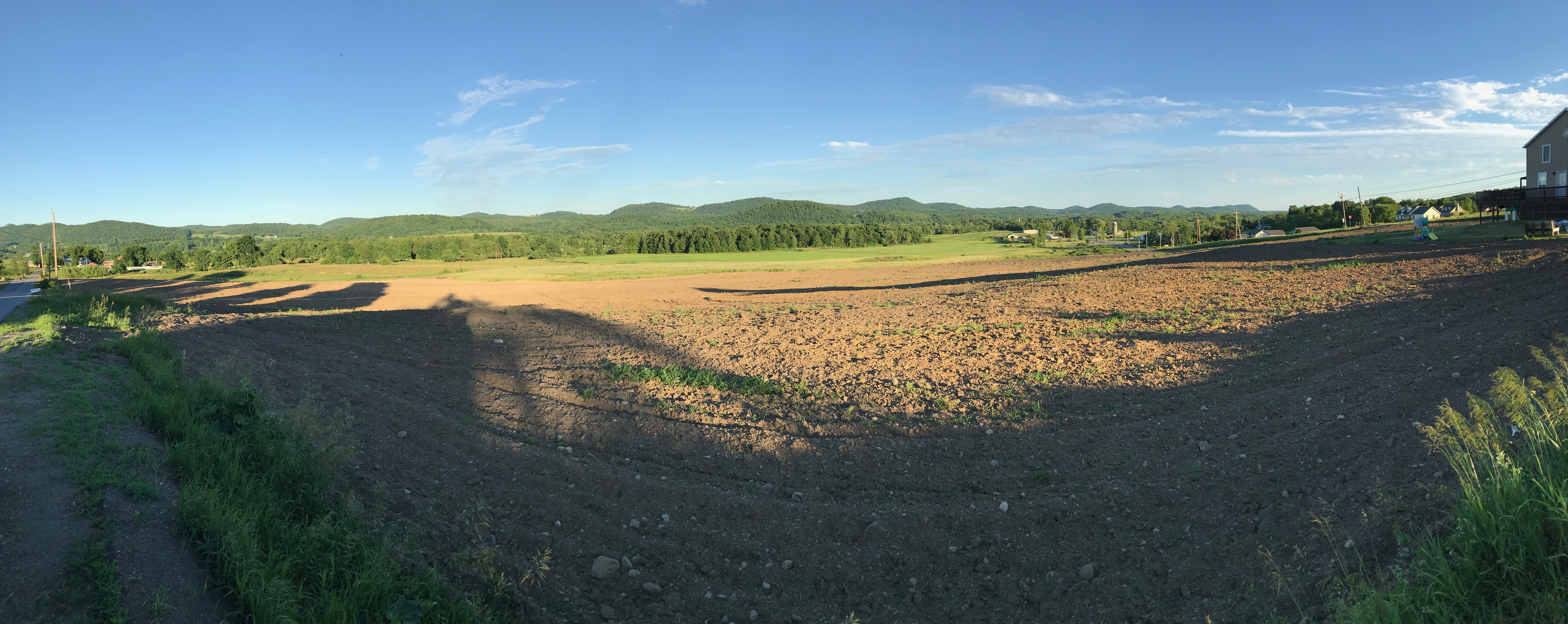
Panoramic view of Argyle, New York; June 2018

NY Route 40 is a north–south highway in the town and NY Route 197 is an east–west highway leading to/from nearby Fort Edward and Interstate 87 (New York). Amtrak has a train station at Fort Edward which daily serves both the Adirondack (train) traveling between New York City and Montreal, Canada and the Ethan Allen Express which operates between New York City and Burlington, Vermont. The Empire State Trail, a 750-mile multi-use biking and hiking trail, completed in 2020 connects New York City with the Canadian border and runs along the Hudson River and the Champlain Canal just west of Argyle.

== Demographics ==
Historical population
Census	Pop.	Note	%±
1790	2,341		—
1800	4,597		96.4%
1810	3,803		−17.3%
1820	2,811		−26.1%
1830	3,459		23.1%
1840	3,111		−10.1%
1850	3,274		5.2%
1860	3,139		−4.1%
1870	2,850		−9.2%
1880	2,775		−2.6%
1890	2,313		−16.6%
1900	1,995		−13.7%
1910	1,806		−9.5%
1920	1,535		−15.0%
1930	1,452		−5.4%
1940	1,611		11.0%
1950	1,801		11.8%
1960	1,898		5.4%
1970	2,415		27.2%
1980	2,847		17.9%
1990	3,031		6.5%
2000	3,688		21.7%
2010	3,782		2.5%
2020	3,644		−3.6%
U.S. Decennial Census

As of the U.S. census of 2020 and the 2022 American Community Survey there were 3,644 people, with 1,422 households, in the town. The population density was 65.1 people per square mile (25.1 people/km^{2}). There were 1,890 housing units of which 1,454 were occupied at an average density of 31.7 per square mile (12.2/km^{2}). The racial makeup of the town was 91.8% White, 0.52% Black or African American, 0.08% Native American, 0.03% Asian, 0.74% from other races, and 6.3% from two or more races. Hispanic or Latino of any race were 1.89% of the population.

There were 1,422 households, out of which 20.7% had children under the age of 18 living with them, 50.9% were married couples living together, 20.2% had a female householder with no spouse present, 19% had a male householder with no spouse present, and 9.9% were non-families. The average family size was 3.11.

In the town, the population was spread out, with 20.7% under the age of 18 and 22.2% who were 65 years of age or older. The median age was 47.2 years. Veterans comprised 5.6% of the population and 18.4% of residents had attained a bachelor's degree of higher. 12.4% of the population have a disability and 7.6% of the population were without health insurance.

The median income for a household in the town was $66,000, and the median income for a family was $76,389. The per capita income for the town was $32,643. About 8.4% of the population were below the poverty line, including 12.4% of those under age 18 and 1.3% of those age 65 or over.

== Government ==
The town of Argyle has the village called Argyle within its borders. Largely an agricultural community since its founding, the town experienced an almost 80-year period of population growth through 2010, according to the US Census Bureau, fueled by abundant land and proximity to nearby work, cultural, and outdoor activities. Argyle Town government consists of a town board (an elected town supervisor and four town council members). Residents of Argyle, as of the 2020 US Census-derived redistricting, are within New York's 21st congressional district, New York's 43rd State Senate district, and the 114th NY State Assembly district. The town has fire protection provided by the J.A. Barkley Hose Company No. 1/Argyle Fire-Rescue Department and near Cossayuna Lake in the southeastern portion of the town by the Cossayuna Volunteer Fire Department. The Argyle Rescue Squad provides emergency medical service. Law enforcement is provided by New York State Police from Troop G, the Washington County Sheriff's Office and by officers of the New York State Department of Environmental Conservation Region 5 office. Children of school age in both the town and village of Argyle, who use public schools, attend Argyle Central School except for a small area in the northwestern portion of the town, in which students attend Hudson Falls public schools. In 2014, the town passed a local law designating Argyle as a Right To Farm community which sets forth a process to mediate complaints by non-farm neighbors about farming operations and practices.

== Culture ==
Some notable community events include a Memorial Day parade and ceremony led by Argyle American Legion Post 1518, a plant and bake sale on Memorial Day weekend at the Argyle Free Library, an annual July 4 parade and chicken barbeque hosted by the men and women of the Argyle Fire-Rescue Department, an Argyle Methodist Church Election Dinner, a Thanksgiving Holiday meal provided by F.E.A.S.T (friends ensuring a super thanksgiving) for those wishing to enjoy a traditional thanksgiving meal, a hometown holiday community celebration with tree lighting the second Sunday of December, a book fair by the Argyle Free Library on July 4, the Carl Lufkin Memorial Pull for the Cure - a Garden Tractor and 4WD truck pull in July which raises money for several charities helping in the fight against cancer, and a town-wide garage sale over the Columbus Day Holiday.

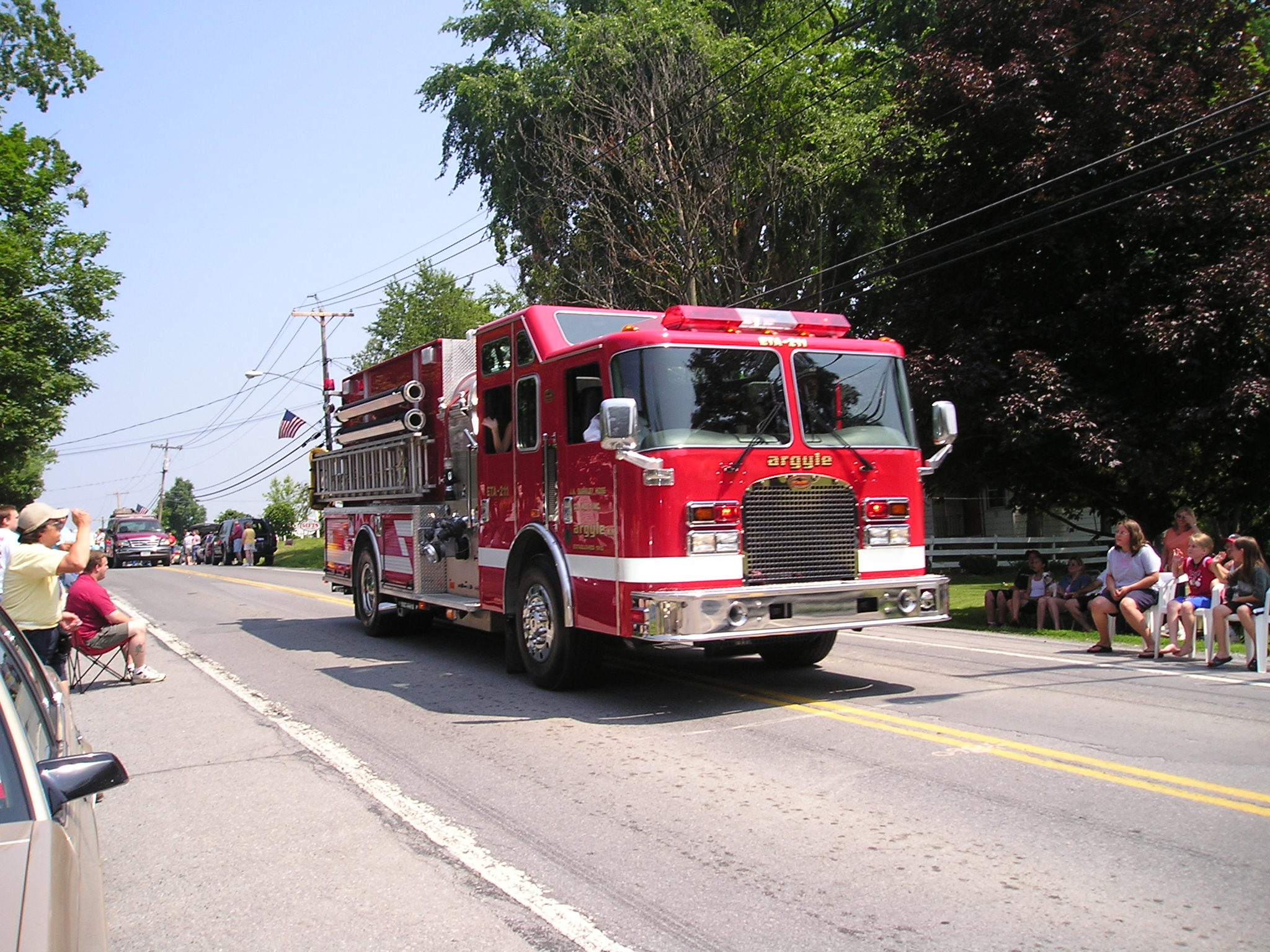
Argyle Fire-Rescue Department fire engine in Argyle, New York 4th of July parade.

On September 18, 2021, Argyle honored its Scottish heritage with a Thistle (national flower of Scotland) Day community celebration after a nearly 100-year hiatus. A parade, chicken and pork barbeques, craft and farmers markets, a concert, and fireworks were part of the day's events. The Thistle Day celebration has continued each year since and now includes a bonfire and Scottish games.

In 1983, the former Camp Algonquin summer camp on the east end of Summit Lake was a major film location for the cult slasher movie Sleepaway Camp.

Season 11, Episode 7 of the PBS documentary TV series Finding Your Roots hosted by Henry Louis Gates Jr. titled The Ties That Bind highlighted actress Kristen Bell's 7th great-grandfather; William Bell who moved with his family to the Township of Argyle in the mid-1770's from Scotland.

== Notable people ==
- John Allen Family - Frontier family living in South Argyle who were massacred on July 25/26, 1777 by Native Americans attached to British General John Burgoyne's Army as they were moving southwards toward the Battles of Saratoga during the American Revolutionary War.
- Alexander Barkley - New York State Republican Legislator during 1865-1866 who lived and died in Argyle. He won statewide election in 1871 and served as Canal Commissioner from 1872 to 1874.
- Ebenezer Clark - Elected to the 1st New York State Legislature which met from Sep 1777 to Jun 1778. Subsequently, elected to the 2nd, 12th, 13th, 15th, and 20-25th state legislatures. Elected by the New York State Assembly in 1799 to serve on the Council of Appointment. Buried in the Old Scots Cemetery in Argyle.
- Evelyn Clark Colfax - Born in Argyle in 1823 and married Schuyler Colfax (Speaker of the U.S. House of Representatives 1863-1869 and first Vice President for Ulysses S. Grant) on October 10, 1844, at the family home in Argyle.
- Edward Dodd - Moved to Argyle in 1835 from nearby Salem and served as a member of the U.S. House of Representatives from 1855 to 1859. He was an early member of the Republican Party.
- Eliakim Doolittle (1772–1850), composer
- Julia Spencer-Fleming - Author of mystery novels set in fictional Millers Kill, New York, who lived and attended school in Argyle in the 1970s.
- Neal Justin - Arizona state politician and professor who was born in Argyle.
- Henry McFadden (1798–1875), farmer and New York state politician. He was born in Argyle.
- John Alexander McGeoch An American psychologist and educator who was born in Argyle in 1897. Considered a modern functionalist, his interests focused on human learning and memory. He was the chair of the department of psychology at the University of Missouri from 1930 to 1935, Wesleyan University from 1935 to 1939, and University of Iowa from 1939 to 1942.
- Jane McCrae - American woman killed in Fort Edward a day after the John Allen Family was massacred in July 1777 after being abducted from Sarah McNeil's home in lot 141 of the Argyle Patent.
- Grandma Moses - Renowned American folk artist; worked for a time in Argyle.
- Robert S. Robertson - U.S. Congressional Medal of Honor recipient from the Battle of Corbin's Bridge in May 1864. He was born and raised in North Argyle, and after the Civil War was elected Lieutenant Governor of Indiana in November 1886.
- Robert B. Scott - U.S. Congressional Medal of Honor recipient from a battle during the U.S. - Indian War in 1869. He is buried in Argyle's Prospect Hill Cemetery.
- David Sheridan - Inventor of catheters and philanthropist, who created three medical catheter plants in North Argyle, thus employing thousands.

== Communities and locations in the Town of Argyle ==
=== Communities ===
- Argyle – A village within the town, located on NY-40 and NY-197.
- Durkeetown – A location along the western town line with Fort Edward along County Road 46 and Durkeetown Road.
- Goose Island – A hamlet east northeast of Argyle village on County Road 47.
- Lick Springs – A location west of South Argyle.
- North Argyle – A hamlet northeast of Argyle village on NY-40.
- South Argyle– A hamlet south of Argyle village on NY-40.
- The Hook – An area on County Road 45 where there were once hotels for travelers along a coach road and a restaurant called the Hook Pantry.

=== Geographic locations ===
- Argyle Airport (1C3) – A grass strip airport, northeast of Argyle village.
- Barkley Mountain – An elevation east of the community of Argyle (627 feet; 191 m).
- Cossayuna Lake – The largest body of water in the town, located in the southeastern corner (Elevation 422 feet (129 m)).
- Dead Creek – A stream exiting from Argyle at the western town line.
- Moses Kill – A stream passing through North Argyle and Argyle village, which eventually enters the Hudson River in the Town of Fort Edward.
- Mud Pond – A small lake north of Goose Island.
- Murdock Mountain – An elevation north of Summit Lake (1,014 feet; 309 m).
- Summit Lake – A lake west of Cossayuna Lake with previous names of Leigh's, Little, and Tinkey's Lake.
- Tamarack Swamp – A swamp by the northern town line.
- Todd Mountain – An elevation running parallel to Coot Hill Road, northwest of Goose Island (1,038 feet; 316 m).
- Wood Creek – A stream exiting from Argyle near the northwestern corner and running north to the Champlain Canal.
