= Goose Island, New York =

- hamlet
- Location within New York
- Coordinates: 43°15′15″N 73°25′25″W
- Country: United States
- State: New York
- County: Washington
- Elevation: 718 ft (219 m)
- Time zone: UTC-5 (Eastern (EST))
  - Summer (DST): UTC-4 (EDT)
- Area code: 518
- GNIS feature ID: 972554

Goose Island is a hamlet in Argyle, Washington County, New York, United States. It is located along County Route 47 near the Argyle - Hebron Town lines and consists of a small number of farms and homes clustered near the intersection of County Route 47 and Goose Island Road. North of the intersection on Goose Island Road is the Goose Island Potato Farm, where the McKernon families host U-Pick events on several weekends each year.

The U.S. National Weather Service confirmed an EF-1 tornado touched down near the hamlet of Goose Island on Monday, 10 August 2020. Damage to the roofs and sidings of nearby homes was minimal and no injuries were reported, although many trees were snapped or uprooted. At least five tornadoes have been confirmed in Washington County since 1950, according to TornadoHistoryProject.com, although this is the first tornado to be confirmed within the town during that time.
