= Cossayuna Lake =

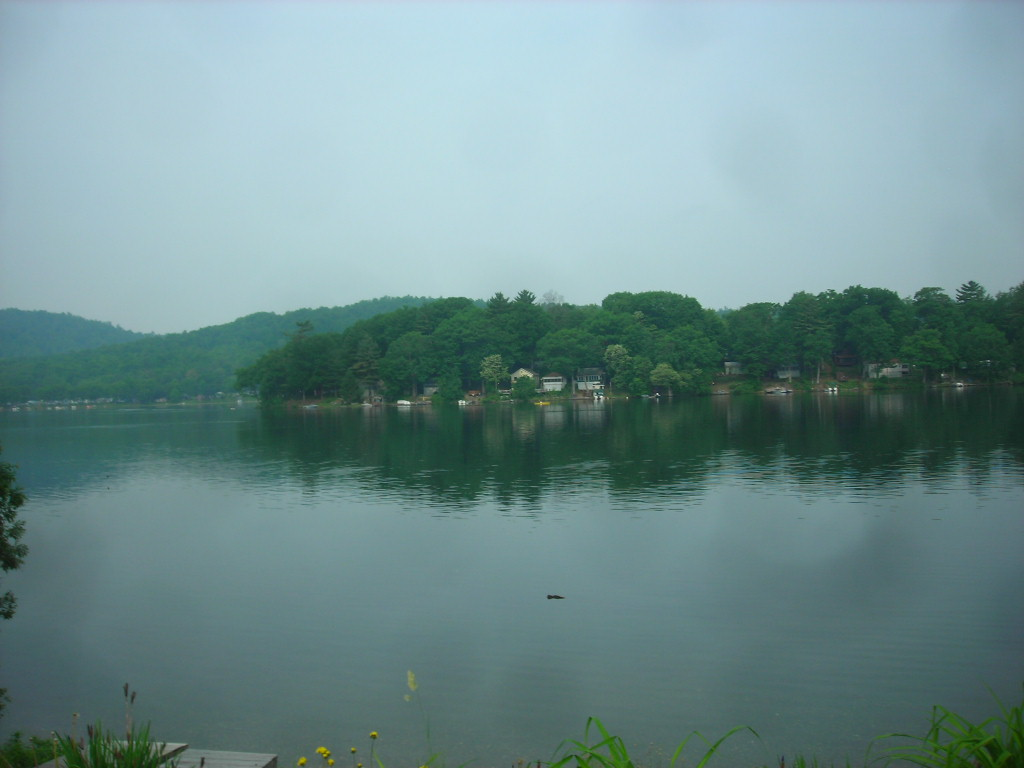

- Location within New York Location within the United States
- Location: Washington County, New York, United States
- Coordinates: 43°12′22.82″N 73°25′22.98″W
- Type: Lake
- Basin countries: United States
- Surface area: 661 acres (2.67 km^{2})
- Average depth: 12 feet (3.7 m)
- Max. depth: 25 feet (7.6 m)
- Shore length^{1}: 8.6 miles (13.8 km)
- Surface elevation: 481 feet (147 m)
- Islands: 4 Big Island
- Settlements: Cossayuna, New York
- ^{1} Shore length is not a well-defined measure.

Cossayuna Lake is located north of Cossayuna, New York. Fish species present in the lake are bluegill, rock bass, tiger muskie, carp, smallmouth bass, largemouth bass, yellow perch, northern pike, pumpkinseed sunfish, and brown bullhead. There is a hard surface launch ramp off East Lake Road.

Cossayuna Lake is located in the towns of Argyle and Greenwich, in southern Washington County, near the eastern border of New York. Cossayuna has come to be known as a community or neighborhood that includes not only the lake and the village at the south end, but also the highland back of the west shore known as Dutchtown and the highland back of the east shore known as Bunker Hill. Also included are the road to South Argyle as far as the South Argyle Church, south on Sand street to the Robertson farm and the high long hill rising abruptly from the south end of the lake. This hill was called Stewart Hill in the early days, named for the ancestor of the merchant family of that name, and now known, on its north side as Ramsey Hill, on its south side as Ramsey Hill, and on its west end as Rock Hill. The peak of the hill is owned by the Gillis family in 2023 and a residence has been built on the top of the hill that has a view or the entire lake.

The name Cossayuna is a corruption of Quabbauna, the Native American name for the lake. Tradition says that this name means "The Lake of the Three Pines", for the three enormous pines which grew on the Oaks point. Native American tradition also notes that the region was the home of the Horican tribe of Indians. The Horicons were kinsmen of the Mohicans and the Hoosacs, but had completely disappeared before Europeans came to America.

Tradition, handed down from the time the St. Ange Frenchmen visited the Hoosick Valley before 1600, tells of a much-used fishing and hunting trail. The trail led from the Tiashoke corn and pumpkin field of the local inhabitants, near Eagle Bridge, up the Owl Kill, through the present village of Cambridge to the Jackson ponds and over the hill and up the Cossayuna Creek to the lake. The hills were covered with a dense primeval forest in which large pines predominated.

The Argyle Patent

In 1764 Archibald Campbell of Raritan, N.J., and Christopher Yates of Schenectady, N.Y., came to the area to survey the Argyle Patent. The Argyle Patent included the present town of Argyle, the present village of Fort Edward, and that part of the town of Greenwich lying east of a north and south line passing through a point a short distance east of the Center Falls school house. This Patent was granted by the Province of New York to a large group of Scottish Highlanders who came to America about 1740 from the Hebrides island of Islay. The interested reader is referred to “A History of The Argyle Patent” published by the Washington County Historical Society.

The First Settlers

The first settlers came in 1765. They included Alexander McNaughton, Cornelius McEachron and his brother Peter, and Duncan McArthur. None of the original patentees settled in the Cossayuna area except John McEachron who joined his brothers after the Revolutionary War.

There were very few other new settlers until after the war. The frontier location, the threat of invasion from the north, and the difficulties in obtaining land titles from the widely scattered patentee owners, discouraged prospective settlers. After the Revolution there was a steady trickle of new settlers. By 1790, they were coming in considerable numbers and by 1812 some start had been made in clearing and settlement of all the lots of the Patent. The original houses had been log cabins with dirt floors and field stone mud-plastered chimneys. Soon after 1800, these had been replaced with frame dwellings.

The new settlers were principally of English ancestry from New England with a sprinkling of Scots-Irish. A considerable number were Palatine Dutch from the lower Hudson Valley.

The Village

The site of Cossayuna Village is a natural crossroads and the development of a village was greatly helped by the fact that the outlet of the lake offered potential water power. Water power, even in such small measure as is to be found here, was in great demand in the early days for grinding grain and for sawing the vast harvest of logs. There were three power sites developed at the village pond and before 1800, each of them operated a saw mill. An early mill was built by Asa Carter below the village. The first grist mill was built in 1810 and was operated for approximately sixty years. For many of these years, William S. Taber was the miller. The last miller was Casper Dings.

The most extensive of the manufacturing enterprises was the blanket factory operated at the lower power site by William and James Alexander. This small factory which produced inexpensive woolen blankets operated from 1885 to 1915. It furnished employment for about a dozen men and women.

These little water powers are now idle and probably have no value as generators of power, but the upper dam, near the post office, serves to maintain the present level of the lake.

Civil Government

Originally, all the community was in the town of Argyle in the county of Albany of the Province of New York. The Argyle Patent had made provision for the establishment of town government. Such government was set up in 1771. The town supervisors for the first ten years were from the East Greenwich area in the present town of Greenwich. Charlotte county was set off from Albany in 1772. The county name was changed to Washington in 1784. The town of Argyle was formally established by the state in 1786. At that time the west two-thirds of the present town of Greenwich and the whole of the present town of Fort Edward were added to the township. In 1803 the town of Greenwich was set off from Argyle. The first election in the county was in 1778. Only 198 votes were cast and there was no voting in Argyle.

The establishment of the town of Greenwich divided the Cossayuna community between the two towns. In Greenwich are; the east shore north to include the Y.M.C.A. camp, the Bunker Hill and Sand Street regions, the village of Cossayuna and as far west on the South Argyle Road as the foot of Ramsey Hill. All the remainder of the community, including two thirds of the shore line of the lake, is in the town of Argyle.

Cossayuna Lake Improvement Association

The Cossayuna Lake Improvement Association (CLIA) was formed in 1954 by a group of residents of the vicinity surrounding Cossayuna Lake. The first meeting was held on August 22 of that year. Officers were elected, committees appointed, and various matters were discussed concerning the good and welfare of the community. Subsequently, a constitution and by-laws were adopted, and the Association was incorporated.

The main purpose of the early organization was to encourage social life among its members, promote social activities among the younger members of the community, and to promote the health and general welfare, improvement and advancement of the community. The organization maintains a website: http://www.cossayunalake.com.

In 1988 the band Phish played a concert on the shores of the lake.
