= Robert B. Scott =

American soldier

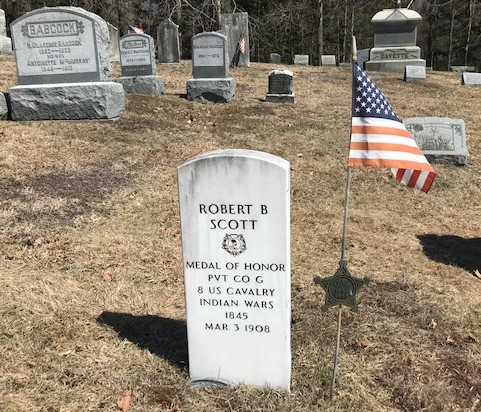
- Headstone in Argyle NY's Prospect Hill Cemetery for Robert B. Scott who was honored with a U.S. Congressional Medal of Honor.
- Born: January 24, 1845; Argyle, New York, US
- Died: March 3, 1908; Argyle, New York, US
- Burial place: Prospect Hill Cemetery, Argyle, New York
- Military career
- Allegiance: United States of America; United States Army
- Rank: Private
- Unit: Medal of Honor with Company G of 8th United States Cavalry 1869
- Conflicts: Battle at Chiricahua Mountains (MOH); American Indian Wars
- Awards: Medal of Honor

Robert B. Scott (January 23, 1845 – March 3, 1908) was a United States Army soldier who received the Medal of Honor for his actions during the American Indian Wars, while serving with Company G, 8th Regiment of the United States Cavalry.

U.S. Medal of Honor version given from 1862 to 1895

== Battle report ==
A detachment of 66 men of the 1st Cavalry Regiment and 61 men of Company G under Lieutenant John Lafferty of the 8th Cavalry had tracked the Apaches into the Chiricahua Mountains and eventually to an engagement what some called the "Campaign of the Rocky Mesa." The combined troops were led by Captain Reuben F. Bernard of the 1st Cavalry. The cool overcast day became "a miserable day, cold with rain and hail, when the cavalrymen attacked." The Apaches were well entrenched and defending behind rocks and boulders near the top of a ridge. The soldiers had to climb a defile or a steep-sided and narrow passage of loose slick rocks to go over and around as they moved up toward the top of the mesa. More than one fell due to the weather conditions. Under these deplorable conditions Scott and his fellow soldiers advanced upwards toward the hostile Indians.

Captain Bernard noted in his report: "These men are they who advanced with me up the steep and rocky mesa under as heavy a fire as I ever saw delivered from the number of men, Indians, say from one hundred to two hundred. These men advanced under this fire until within thirty steps from the Indians when they came to a ledge of rocks where every man who showed his head was shot at by several Indians at once. Here the men remained and did good shooting through the crevices of the rocks until ordered to fall back which was done by running from rock to rock where they would halt and return the fire of the Indians."

As darkness fell, Scott with other cavalrymen were ordered to withdraw. They did so in good order individually and in small groups taking their wounded with them down the dangerous slick slopes under enemy fire. Some would provide covering fire while others retreated a short distance, then the process would repeat. Scott's commanding officer, Lt. Lafferty, in trying to recover dead soldiers was shot in the mouth destroying his lower left jaw. The entire action cost a likely overestimated 15 to 18 Apache lives and two confirmed soldiers dead with about 4 or 5 (accounts differ) wounded troopers. This engagement was caused by an earlier attack (October 5) on a stagecoach that killed two civilians and four soldiers traveling as passengers to Tucson, Arizona and an attack on a group of cowboys in the Sulphur Springs Valley by Apache Indians.

== Citation ==
The President of the United States of America, in the name of Congress, takes pleasure in presenting the Medal of Honor to Private Robert B. Scott, United States Army, for gallantry in action on October 20, 1869, while serving with Company G, 8th U.S. Cavalry, in action at Chiricahua Mountains, Arizona Territory.

== See also ==
- List of Medal of Honor recipients
