= Benton J. Underwood =

American psychologist

- Born: February 28, 1915; Center Point, Iowa
- Died: November 29, 1994 (aged 79); Park Ridge, Illinois
- Education: University of Missouri (M.S.); University of Iowa (Ph.D.)
- Scientific career
- Fields: Psychology
- Workplaces: Northwestern University
- Thesis: The effect of successive interpolations on retroactive and proactive inhibition (1942)
- Doctoral advisors: John Alexander McGeoch; Kenneth Spence
- Doctoral students: Sarnoff A. Mednick

Benton J. Underwood (February 28, 1915 – November 29, 1994) was an American psychologist. Underwood was chairman of the department of psychology at Northwestern University, a member of the National Academy of Sciences. Underwood also was president of the Midwestern Psychological Association, president of the Experimental Psychology, president of the General Psychology divisions of the American Psychological Association, Stanley G. Harris Professor of Social Science, and chairman of the psychology section of the American Association for the Advancement of Science. Chicago Tribune called Underwood "a leading expert from the 1940s to the 1980s on verbal learning and memory". American Psychological Association called him "a preeminent leader in the development of research on the acquisition and retention of verbal material". Among the list of his many remarkable students was Sarnoff A. Mednick who pioneered the High-Risk for schizophrenia paradigm in 1962.

Underwood received the following awards:

- Distinguished Scientific Contribution Award from The American Psychological Association
- Distinguished Teaching Award in Psychology from The American Psychological Association
- the Warren Medal by the Society of Experimental Psychologists
- A Review of General Psychology survey, published in 2002, ranked Underwood as the 66th most cited psychologist of the 20th century.
