= Ventricular-brain ratio =

Ratio of ventricle area to brain area

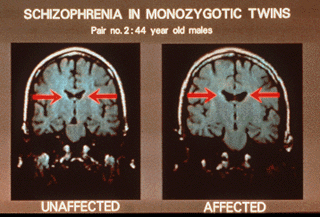
Example of enlarged lateral ventricles in schizophrenia.

Ventricular-brain ratio (VBR), also known as the ventricle-to-brain ratio or ventricle-brain ratio, is the ratio of total ventricle area to total brain area, which can be calculated with planimetry from brain imaging techniques such as CT scans. It is a common measure of ventricular dilation or cerebral atrophy in patients with traumatic brain injury or hydrocephalus ex vacuo. VBR also tends to increase with age.

Generally, a higher VBR means a worse prognosis for recovering from a brain injury. For example, VBR is significantly correlated with performance on the Luria-Nebraska neuropsychological battery. Studies have found people with schizophrenia have larger third ventricles and VBR. Correlational studies have found relationships between ventricle-brain ratio and binge eating and inversely with plasma thyroid hormone concentration.

== See also ==
- Sarnoff A. Mednick
- Ventriculomegaly
