= Ventriculomegaly =

Increased size of the lateral ventricles

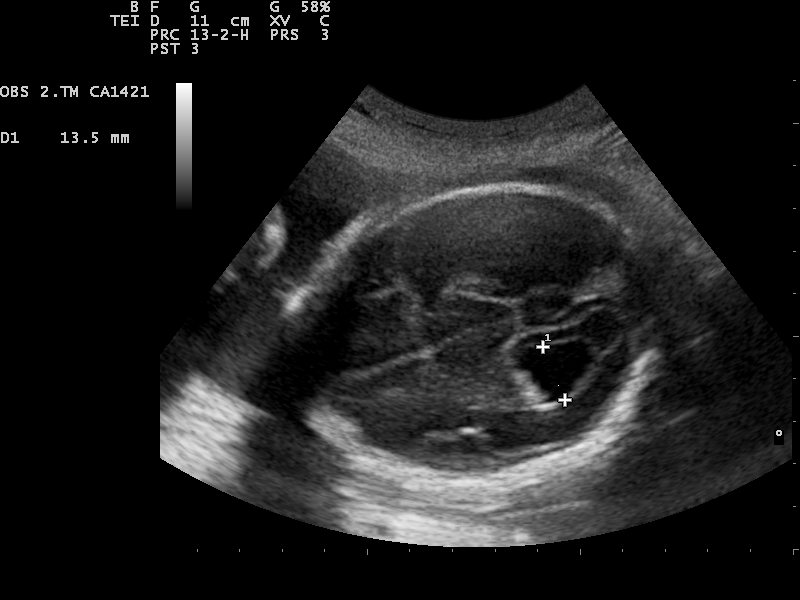

Ventriculomegaly is a brain condition that mainly occurs in the fetus when the lateral ventricles become dilated. The ventricular system of the brain develops from cerebral vesicles. In early brain development, the wide cerebral ventricles are surrounded by thin neural tissue. The final shape of the lateral ventricles is caused by the rapidly growing neocortex under the pressure of hemispheric rotation. The cerebral hemispheres curve backward and outward in early development. The frontal horns develop first, followed by the temporal horns, and finally the occipital horns.

The width of the atrium of the lateral ventricle does not change significantly during fetal development and therefore becomes a stable marker for identifying fetal ventriculomegaly. The most common definition uses a width of the atrium of the lateral ventricle of greater than 10 mm. This occurs in around 1% of pregnancies. When this measurement is between 10 and 15 mm, the ventriculomegaly may be described as mild to moderate. When the measurement is greater than 15mm, the ventriculomegaly may be classified as more severe.

Enlargement of the ventricles may occur for a number of reasons, such as loss of brain volume (perhaps due to infection or infarction), or impaired outflow or absorption of cerebrospinal fluid from the ventricles, called hydrocephalus or normal pressure hydrocephalus associated with conspicuous brain sulcus. Often, however, there is no identifiable cause. The interventricular foramen may be congenitally malformed, or may have become obstructed by infection, hemorrhage, or rarely tumor, which may impair the drainage of cerebrospinal fluid, and thus accumulation in the ventricles.

This diagnosis is generally found in routine fetal anomaly scans at 18–22 weeks gestation. It is one of the more common abnormal brain findings on prenatal ultrasound, occurring in around 1–2 per 1,000 pregnancies. In many cases of mild ventriculomegaly, however, there is resolution of ventriculomegaly during the pregnancy.

== Associations ==
Ventriculomegaly is also known to be associated with other malformations such as agenesis of the corpus callosum, spina bifida, and heart defects. Fetuses with both isolated ventriculomegaly and with other anomalies have an increased risk of having a chromosomal abnormality, including that of Down syndrome.

Many conditions associated with ventriculomegaly can be defined prior to birth, but the possibility remains of other anomalies (either structural, chromosomal or genetic) only being identified later in pregnancy or after birth. Ventriculomegaly associated with abnormal findings and other structural malformations, often has an adverse prognosis, which ranges from disability (often mild) to death. However, in cases of mild isolated ventriculomegaly, there is around a 90% chance of a normal outcome.

Increasingly, fetal magnetic resonance imaging is being considered as part of the assessment of pregnancies complicated by fetal ventriculomegaly, and appears to be important in the postnatal assessment of affected children.

Although evaluation of lateral ventricles dimensions is decisive for establishing a diagnosis of ventriculomegaly, the shape of the ventricular system, including that of the frontal horns, is also important.

Ventriculomegaly occurs in those with GLUT1 deficiency syndrome.

== See also ==
- Neuroinflammation
- Normal pressure hydrocephalus
- Hydrocephalus
- Progressive multifocal leukoencephalopathy
- Vascular dementia
- Ventriculitis
- Ventricular-brain ratio
