= Sarnoff A. Mednick =

- Born: January 27, 1928
- Died: April 10, 2015 (aged 87)
- Education: Northwestern University
- Awards: Joseph Zubin Award (1996)
- Scientific career
- Fields: Psychology
- Thesis: Distortions in the gradient of stimulus generalization related to critical brain damage and schizophrenia (1954)
- Doctoral advisor: Benton J. Underwood

Sarnoff Andrei Mednick, (January 27, 1928 – April 10, 2015) was a psychologist who pioneered the prospective high-risk, longitudinal study to investigate the etiology (causes) of psychopathology, or mental disorders. His emphasis was on schizophrenia. He made significant contributions to the study of creativity, psychopathy, alcoholism and suicide in schizophrenia. He was a Professor Emeritus at The University of Southern California, where he had been a tenured professor since the early '70s and remained highly active in his eighties. Mednick was the first scientist to revisit the genetic basis of mental disorders, following the era of eugenics. He was the recipient of the Joseph Zubin Award in 1996, with more than 300 peer-reviewed publications on the topic.

== Career ==
Mednick received his Ph.D. at Northwestern University, where he was a student of Benton J. Underwood. He later began his career as a professor at Harvard University, then took a position at the University of Michigan, where he was best known for his verbal learning experiments and other cross-sectional studies, and for his theorizing on creativity (also see the Remote Associates Test of creativity), psychopathy and schizophrenia. It was at the University of Michigan that he began to question his own methodology of cross-sectional studies (the popular methodology at the time) and to develop his rationale for the high-risk study, one of his greatest contributions to the field of psychology and psychiatry. He noted that many of the findings of differences between adult schizophrenics and normal controls that were published at the time were not replicated. Each study tended to use available control samples of convenience (such as the relatives of hospitalized persons with schizophrenia) and so turned out to be the result of individuals suffering the effects of a life of schizophrenia. Elements affecting the outcome of these studies were poor diet, the side effects of medications, and psychosocial effects of hospitalization, all of which were associated with living with schizophrenia, but that were not of etiological significance (but rather epiphenomenal). Although Mednick's work was highly celebrated in the early '60s and he continued to obtain National Institute of Mental Health funding, he decided to take a great risk by saving his NIMH money to launch a prospective longitudinal study, which would be so difficult and expensive that his colleagues at the time thought it was chimerical.

Mednick, along with his student Thomas McNeil, proposed, in a classic monograph, to study persons at risk for schizophrenia before they fell ill, by studying children of women with schizophrenia (who are sixteen more times likely to develop schizophrenia). While at the University of Michigan, he set up a study in Denmark (through an institute he helped develop), because Denmark has a central mental health register, adoption register, death register, and various means of tracing subjects across generations. In addition, because it is a homogeneous and stable population, it is easy to trace subjects over time. His study, far from being chimerical, led to a number of critical discoveries in the field.

A recent Documentary entitled "The Search for Myself" alleges the Danish study was a CIA-funded experiment in which the 311 orphaned children were tortured in violation of the Nuremberg Code of 1947.

== The Copenhagen High Risk for Schizophrenia study ==
At the time the High-Risk-for-Schizophrenia study began, in 1962, the offspring of the women with schizophrenia were average age 15 and had not come into the risk period for schizophrenia. (See a review by Cannon and Mednick, 1993.) By the early eighties, many of the study's subjects had fallen ill with schizophrenia. Colleagues and students of Mednick began to examine the association between schizophrenia outcomes and earlier risk factors. Perhaps the first study to support Kraepelin's notion of dementia praecox (that persons with schizophrenia had early dementia), was a study that showed that offspring of those with schizophrenia who had the most serious symptomatology had enlarged ventricles on CT scans suggestive of brain atrophy. In a study by Silverton et al. those with the most severe schizophrenia symptoms on outcome had low birthweights decades before. Their hypothesis that low birthweight might be associated with insults in utero was corroborated. In a follow-up study, the authors tested the notion that schizophrenia is the result of a genetic by environmental interaction, that is that insults in utero may be specifically stressful to persons with a brain vulnerability to schizophrenia. In a follow-up study, Leigh Silverton and Sarnoff Mednick at the University of Southern California hypothesized an interaction between genetic risk for schizophrenia might be most vulnerable to insults in utero. This would be considered a gene X environment interaction, a model for the pathogenesis of schizophrenia that Silverton and Mednick began working on in the early eighties. The authors conducted another study in which they separated subjects into high-risk and "super-high risk" and measured the interaction between genetic risk and birthweight in its effect on ventricular-brain ratio. They found that those most vulnerable to low birthweight, a variable representing subtle birth difficulties in utero, were most likely to have early cerebral ventricular enlargement on CT-scans. At the time, the idea both that schizophrenia was a brain disease and that it could represent a gene x environment interaction was novel. This was possibly the first study to support the notion that earlier findings of brain abnormalities in schizophrenia were not only etiologically significant but related to early environmental factors (such as pregnancy and birth complications or in utero insults), and that pathogenesis was related to factors that could be prevented. A study by Cannon, Mednick, and Parnas (1989) also showed an interaction between perinatal insults (an environmental factor) and very high genetic risk for schizophrenia in determining brain deficits in schizophrenia.

Other factors associated with breaking down with schizophrenia were shown by Elaine Walker and Robert Cudeck along with Mednick to be separation for parents (even mothers with schizophrenia) if it led to institutionalization. The outcome of the High-Risk-for-Schizophrenia study showed that it was the interaction between genetics and environment that accounted for schizophrenia. It also suggested that the final common pathway to schizophrenia is expressed as a brain disease.

Before the High Risk for Schizophrenia study, a theory that poverty caused schizophrenia developed because persons with schizophrenia were found in the most impoverished regions of the city. Silverton and Mednick hypothesized, on the other hand that those with schizophrenia drifted into the lower classes as their disease caused a cognitive disability and therefore difficulty working. In a 1984 study, they found that high risk subjects matched for socioeconomic status at birth drifted into lower social classes as the result (rather than the cause) of schizophrenia

In a 2008 reassessment of the High Risk sample by Leigh Silverton and Sarnoff A. Mednick (supported by a grant to Silverton from the American Foundation for Suicide Prevention) Silverton, Mednick, Holst and John showed a very high relative rate of suicide in those at high risk for schizophrenia. They also showed that although those with schizophrenia may drift into lower social class regions, those of higher social class origins develop schizophrenia suicide at a higher rate than those from lower social classes. The authors reasoned the although schizophrenia may largely be a brain disease, the response to cognitive impairments caused by the disorder may be harder for those from a higher initial social classes and therefore higher self-expectations.

== Studies of criminal behavior ==
In a groundbreaking study in psychopathy or criminal behavior, Mednick, William Gabrielli, and Barry Hutching in an article for Science showed anti-social behavior to have a genetic component, at least in relation to property crimes. Using an adoption paradigm, the authors found no correlation between criminal conviction in the adoptive parents and their children, but there was a correlation between biological father conviction and child conviction. The authors stressed that genetic influences do not mean that anti-social behavior is completely genetically determined, but that it has a genetic component. Earlier in his career, Mednick had hypothesized that autonomic under-arousal may be a genetic factor predisposing to anti-social behavior because under-arousal slows the socialization process.

He helped develop a New Zealand cohort with one of his most notable students at the University of Southern California, Terrie Moffitt, a full professor at Duke University who has developed her own theories of genetic X environmental interactions in the genesis of anti-social behavior.

== Personal life ==
The son of Jewish parents who had immigrated to the United States from Ukraine, Mednick was born on January 27, 1928, and raised in the Bronx in New York City. His mother Fanny Bronstein Mednick, a former factory worker, was a homemaker and his father Harry Mednick worked in his uncles' hat- and cap-making business during the day and as an insurance salesman at night, later training as a television repairman.

Mednick was married to Martha Mednick and then to Birgitte Mednick, both professors. Birgitte died in 2008; Martha in 2020. He had four children: Amy (a writer); Lisa, a musician (with Martha Mednick); Sara Mednick, a professor with expertise in sleep and dreaming; and Thor, an art historian and professor (with Birgitte Mednick). He was born in New York City and died in Toledo, Ohio.
