= Martha Mednick =

American clinical psychologist (1929–2020)

- Born: March 31, 1929
- Died: August 14, 2020 (aged 91)
- Citizenship: American
- Occupation: Feminist Psychologist
- Spouse: Sarnoff Mednick
- Awards: NCMS Distinguished Elders Award from the Society of Counseling Psychology (2009)

Academic background
- Education: City College of New York; Northwestern University

Academic work
- Institutions: Howard University

Martha Tamara Shuch Mednick (March 31, 1929 – August 16, 2020) was a feminist psychologist known for her work on women, gender, race and social class. She was a professor of psychology at Howard University from 1968 until her retirement in 1995.

Mednick played a key role in the founding of the Society for the Psychology of Women (American Psychological Association (APA), Division 35) by organizing the APA Ad Hoc Task Force on the Status of Women, which established the Society in 1973. Mednick served as President of the Society for the Psychology of Women from 1976 to 1977.

Mednick served as President of the Society for the Psychological Study of Social Issues (SPSSI) from 1980 to 1982. In 2009 Mednick received the NCMS Distinguished Elders Award from the Society of Counseling Psychology (APA, Division 17). The NCMS award honors individuals who advocate for justice and human rights.

== Biography ==
Mednick was born into a working class Jewish family in New York City. Her parents were immigrants from Russia and Poland. Mednick graduated from Evander Childs High School in the Bronx and was the first in her family to attend college. She believed education had the power to change one's life and began studying psychology at City College of New York. At the time, City College was mostly a male engineering school that allowed some women to attend. Mednick graduated with a Bachelor of Science in education, and continued her education at Northwestern University where she earned a PhD in Clinical Psychology in 1955. Around this time, she married Sarnoff A. Mednick and started a family. Mednick collaborated with her husband on studies of associative priming, and developed the Remote Associates Test as a test of creative potential.

The family moved several times, with Mednick taking on varied positions, which included work with autistic children at the Harvard University Research Laboratory, and research and teaching positions at the University of California, Berkeley and at the University of Michigan.

Mednick divorced her husband in 1964. She moved to Washington, D.C. in 1968 where she joined the psychology department at Howard University. At Howard, Mednick met Sandra Tangri and together published an issue called "New Perspectives on Women" which later appeared as the book "Woman and achievement: Social and motivational analysis."

Mednick was also important in initiating contact between American and Israeli feminist psychologists. Her “Social Change and Sex Role Inertia: The Case of the Kibbutz” exposed the myth of sexual equality on kibbutzim. Mednick also organized the first international, interdisciplinary conference on women at the University of Haifa in December 1981 with Marilyn Safir, which culminated in the 1985 volume "Women’s worlds: From the new scholarship".

Mednick died on August 16, 2020, after a lengthy battle with cancer.

== Books ==
- Mednick, M. T., Tangri, S. S., & Hoffman, L. W. (1975). Women and achievement: Social and motivational analysis. Hemisphere Publishing Corporation.
- Safir, M. P., Mednick, M. T., Israeli, D., & Bernard, J. (1985).Women’s worlds: From the new scholarship. Praeger.
