= Pressey X-O test =

Psychological test created in 1921

- Purpose: measure of strength and content of emotional responses

The Pressey X-O test was a psychological test created in 1921 by Sidney L. Pressey.

The test consisted of a list of words. A subject was instructed to cross out the words on this list that they felt had unpleasant meanings. It was meant to measure strength and content of emotional responses. The test was of both low reliability and validity and guidelines for the interpretation of scores were poor.
