= Argyle (village), New York =

Village in Washington County, New York, United States

Argyle
- Village
- Location in Washington County and the state of New York.
- Coordinates: 43°14′14″N 73°29′24″W
- Country: United States
- State: New York
- County: Washington

Government
  - Mayor: Darren Smith

Area
  - Total: 0.32 sq mi (0.82 km^{2})
  - Land: 0.32 sq mi (0.82 km^{2})
  - Water: 0 sq mi (0.00 km^{2})
- Elevation: 285 ft (87 m)

Population (2020)
  - Total: 289
  - Density: 912.4/sq mi (352.29/km^{2})
- Time zone: UTC-5 (Eastern (EST))
  - Summer (DST): UTC-4 (EDT)
- ZIP code: 12809
- Area code: 518 838
- FIPS code: 36-02550
- GNIS feature ID: 0942550
- Website: www.argyle-village.org

Argyle is a village in the town of Argyle in Washington County, New York, United States. It is part of the Glens Falls Metropolitan Statistical Area. The village population was 289 at the 2020 census. The Village and Town are named after Argyllshire, Scotland (now Argyll and Bute, Scotland). Many of the original settlers came from Scotland and settled here in the mid-1700s. German, Irish, Dutch, and Polish settlers were also attracted to this area. The 1800s found Argyle residents active in the Underground Railroad and abolitionist movement. Moses Kill provided waterpower for mills in the village. The early 1900s brought a library and running water to residents.

Some notable community events include a Memorial Day parade and ceremony led by Argyle American Legion Post 1518, a plant and bake sale on Memorial Day weekend at the Argyle Free Library, an annual July 4 parade and chicken barbeque hosted by the Argyle Fire-Rescue Department, an Argyle Methodist Church Election Dinner, a Thanksgiving Holiday meal provided by F.E.A.S.T (Friends Ensuring A Super Thanksgiving) for those wishing to enjoy a traditional thanksgiving meal, a book fair by the Argyle Free Library on July 4, the Carl Lufkin Memorial Pull for the Cure - a Garden Tractor and 4WD truck pull in July which raises money for several charities helping in the fight against cancer, and a town-wide garage sale over the Columbus Day Holiday.

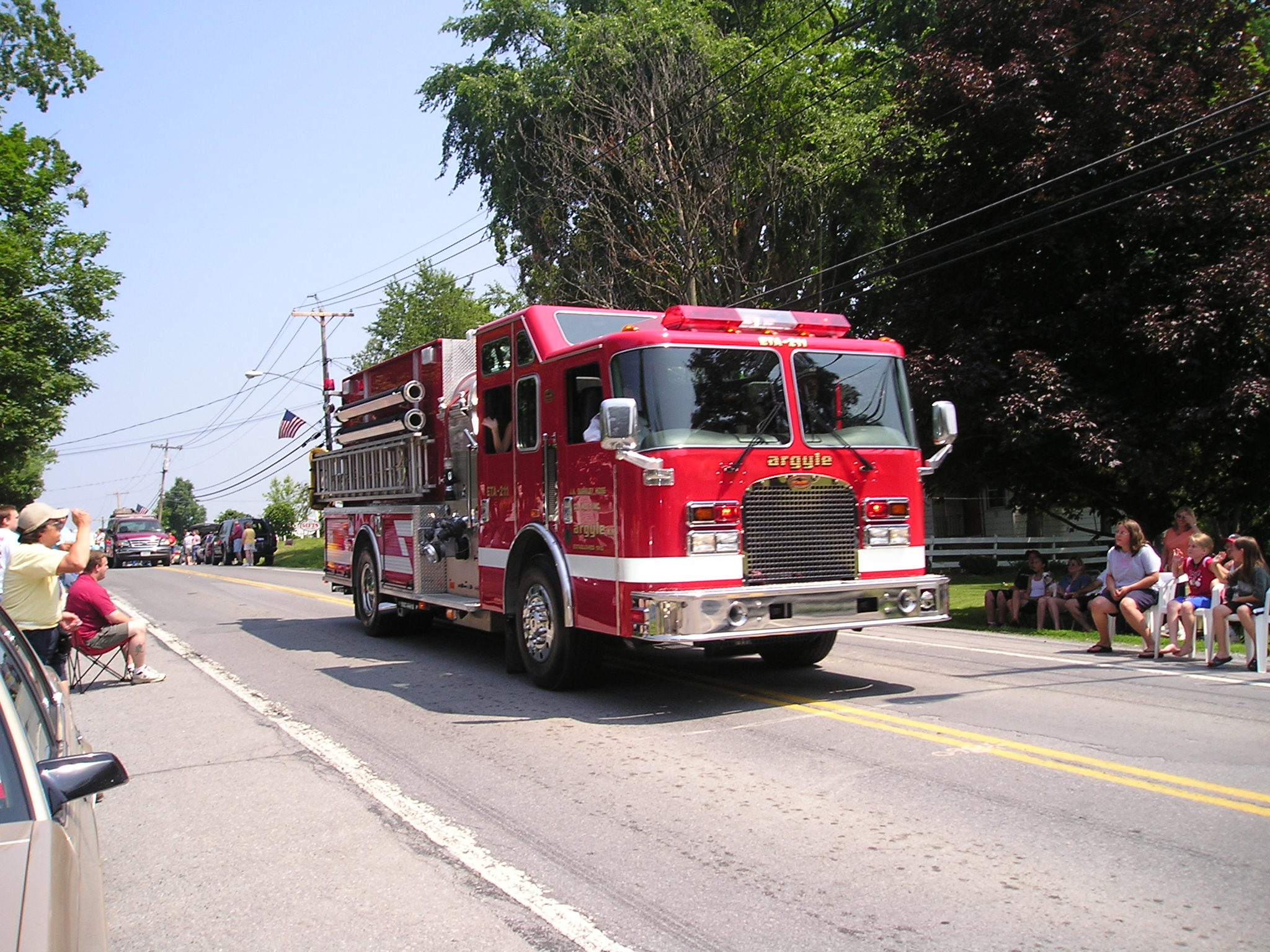
Argyle Fire-Rescue Department fire engine in Argyle, New York 4th of July parade.

On September 18, 2021, Argyle honored its Scottish heritage with a Thistle (national flower of Scotland) Day community celebration after a nearly 100-year hiatus. The celebration has continued yearly since and now includes a bonfire and fireworks along with scottish games, music, food and drink, and community booths.

== History ==
The village was eventually formed from lands designated in the Argyle Patent of May 21, 1764, located in Albany County within the British Colonial Province of New York. After the American Revolutionary War Argyle was part of Washington County which had been renamed to honor American General George Washington in the newly established State of New York. The village developed slower than the town of Argyle and was officially established on March 27, 1838.

From 1806 to 1906, the Washington County Clerk's Office, because of Argyle's central location in the county, resided within the Village. From 1870 to 1906 the Clerk's Office was located in the brick building now occupied by the Argyle branch of Arrow Bank.

== Geography ==
According to the United States Census Bureau, the village has a total area of 0.4 square miles (1.0 km^{2}), all land.

Argyle is located on NY Route 40; a north–south state highway which runs through both the town and village of Argyle. NY Route 197, an east–west state highway, crosses the Hudson River at nearby Fort Edward and ends in the village at a junction with NY Route 40. The Moses Kill, a stream where early settlers built small mills, flows through the village crossing underneath NY Route 197 before eventually emptying into the Hudson River, south of Fort Edward.

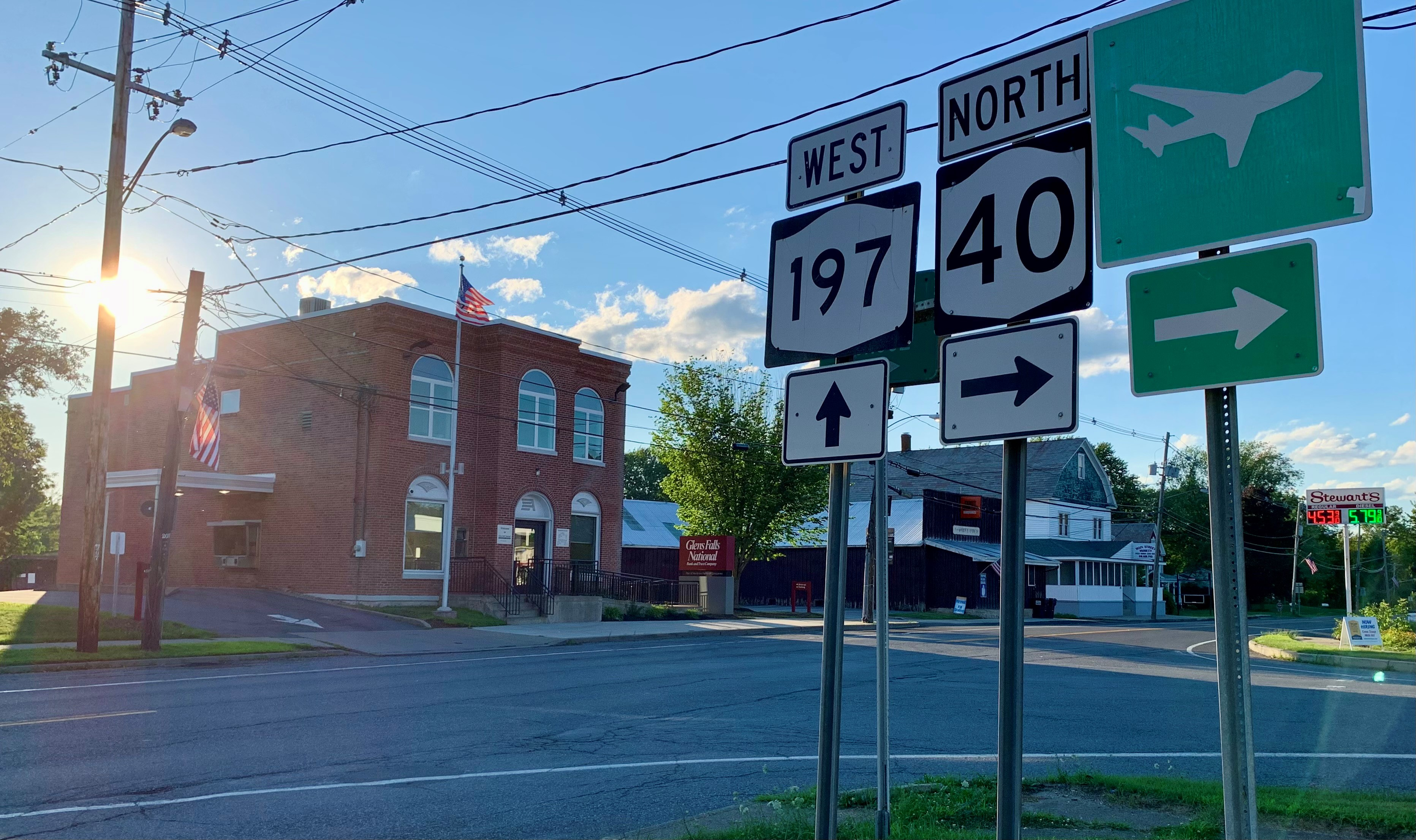
Downtown Argyle business district with Arrow Bank, Argyle Hardware, Stewart's Shop, and Main Street Variety.

== Demographics ==
Historical population
Census	Pop.	Note	%±
1840	500		—
1860	375		—
1870	351		−6.4%
1880	316		−10.0%
1890	158		−50.0%
1900	264		67.1%
1910	231		−12.5%
1920	198		−14.3%
1930	245		23.7%
1940	226		−7.8%
1950	351		55.3%
1960	355		1.1%
1970	392		10.4%
1980	320		−18.4%
1990	295		−7.8%
2000	289		−2.0%
2010	306		5.9%
2020	289		−5.6%
U.S. Decennial Census

As of the census of 2020, there were 289 people living within the Village of Argyle. The population density was 810.9 people per square mile (313.1 people/km^{2}). There were 150 housing units, with 134 occupied, at an average density of 370.4 per square mile (143.0/km^{2}). The racial makeup of the village was 91.3% White, 0.35% Black or African American, 6.9% from other races. Hispanic or Latino of any race were 2.77% of the population.

There were 117 households, 45.3% were married couples living together, 38.5% had a female householder with no spouse present, and 6.8% had a male householder with no spouse present. The average family size was 4.0.

In the village the median age was 38.3, with the population spread out, with 32% under the age of 18, and 19.9% who were 65 years of age or older. 10.1% had a disability and 9.6% of the population had no health insurance. 4.8% were veterans.

The median income for a household in the village was $52,500, for a family was $60,625 and for a married couple with family $88,750. About 18.9% of the population was below the poverty line, including 28.2% of those under the age of eighteen and 12.3% of those 65 or over.
