= Remote Associates Test =

- Purpose: creativity test

The Remote Associates Test (RAT) is a creativity test used to determine a human's creative potential. The test typically lasts forty minutes and consists of thirty to forty questions each of which consists of three common stimulus words that appear to be unrelated. The subject must think of a fourth word that is somehow related to each of the first three words. Scores are calculated based on the number of correct questions.

== Development ==
The Remote Associates Test (RAT), adult form was originally published in 1959, and then again in 1962, by Professor Sarnoff Mednick and Martha T. Mednick. In 1971, Mednick and Mednick published the high school form of the RAT. Mednick and Mednick defined the creative thinking process in the test manual as "the forming of associative elements into new combinations which either meet specified requirements or are in someway useful. The more mutually remote the elements of the new combination, the more creative the process or solution." Mednick reported a Spearman-Brown reliability of RAT=0.92 in one sample of students at an Eastern women’s college, and 0.91 in a sample of men tested at the University of Michigan.

== Layout ==
The two adult forms of the RAT consist of 30 items each. The respondent is allowed 40 minutes to complete the test. Each item provides three stimulus words that are remote from one another; the respondent is then required to find (via the creative process) another word that is a criteria-meeting mediating link, which can be associated with them all in a meaningful way. The test-taker's score is the number correct.

=== Example items ===
Widow, Bite, Monkey	Bass, Complex, Sleep	Bald, Screech, Emblem	Room, Blood, Salts
Spider	Deep	Eagle	Bath

=== Compound Remote Associates Test ===
In Mednick’s two college-level versions of the test, each consisting of 30 items, each item can be associated with the solution word in a number of ways. For example, the three words same/tennis/head are associated with the solution match by means of synonymy (same = match), formation of a compound (matchhead), and semantics association (tennis match). In 2003, Edward M. Bowden and Mark Jung-Beeman developed 144 compound remote associate problems, a subset of RAT problems, for their studies of insight problem solving. They wanted a greater number of problems than were available in the original RAT, and to present participants with a more consistent task – that the solution word would always be related to the stimulus words in the same way. They designed a set of problems to which the solution word was associated with all three words of the triad through formation of a compound word (or phrase) (e.g., age/mile/sand for the compounds Stone Age, milestone, and sandstone with the solution word stone). Solution words were never repeated or used as problem words; problem words were sometimes repeated. The problems can be divided into two types: homogeneous, for which the solution word is a prefix (or suffix) to all three words of the problem triad, and heterogeneous, for which the solution word is a prefix (or suffix) to at least one of the words of the triad and a suffix (prefix) to the other word(s) of the triad. The 144 problems were scored according to the time required to solve them and to the difficulty ratio. This compound RAT gives researchers a cohesive and operational definition normative list, where subjects are able to solve tasks in less time. The increase in the task solving ratios also provides the test with stronger reliability, but at the price of losing complexity and ending up with a less challenging test, in terms of creativity.

==== Example items ====
Fox, Man, Peep	Sleeping, Bean, Trash	Dust, Cereal, Fish
Hole	Bag	Bowl

== Validity ==
According to Mednick, the RAT could be used to test "all fields of creative endeavor" and suggest that those who excel on the RAT will be gifted creatively as well as in the sciences. Mednick also suggested that this test be used to select students from lower-income families to be admitted to special educational programs. However there is no data that shows that students who have done well on the RAT excel in any particular subject leading to criticism of the validity of the RAT. Worthen and Clark (1971) concluded that the RAT measured sensitivity to language rather than creative potential. The correct response is often the most common response and does not link the other three words in any conceptual way. Worthen and Clark improved upon the RAT to create the Functionally Remote Associates Test (FRAT) that depends on functional relationships.

== Impact ==
Despite the original intent for the RAT to be used as a measure of individual differences in associative ability, the RAT has fallen out of use as a self-standing test of creativity. This test has been used to assess a wider range of cognitive abilities thought to underline creative thinking.

Over the years, the RAT has been used to assess various cognitive abilities linked to creativity including insight, memory and problem solving. It has been used to study the relation between creativity and rapid eye movement sleep (REM), peripheral attention, attention deficit, memory, synesthesia, and mental illness. In a meta analysis, surveying 45 studies concerning creativity and neuroimaging, the RAT is shown as the second most used standardized test, following the Alternate Uses Test and placing the Torrance Test of Creativity in third place.

Whether the RAT should be used and interpreted as a measure of associative processing, convergent thinking and/or creative thinking remains an open question on both theoretical and empirical grounds. Currently, the debate surrounding the proper use of the RAT is difficult to settle due to the absence of additional empirical studies examining the internal and external structure of the RAT. Findings from one study provide evidence for the RAT as a convergent thinking test, but much still remains to be understood regarding potential subprocesses of convergent thinking theorized to be assessed by the RAT and how these processes are linked to actual creative behaviors.

== International versions ==
The RAT has been adapted into several versions. Researchers have developed a Jamaican adaptation as well as Hebrew, Dutch, Italian, Chinese, Japanese and German versions.
